= Emil Lewis Holmdahl =

American soldier of fortune active in the twentieth century

Emil Holmdahl
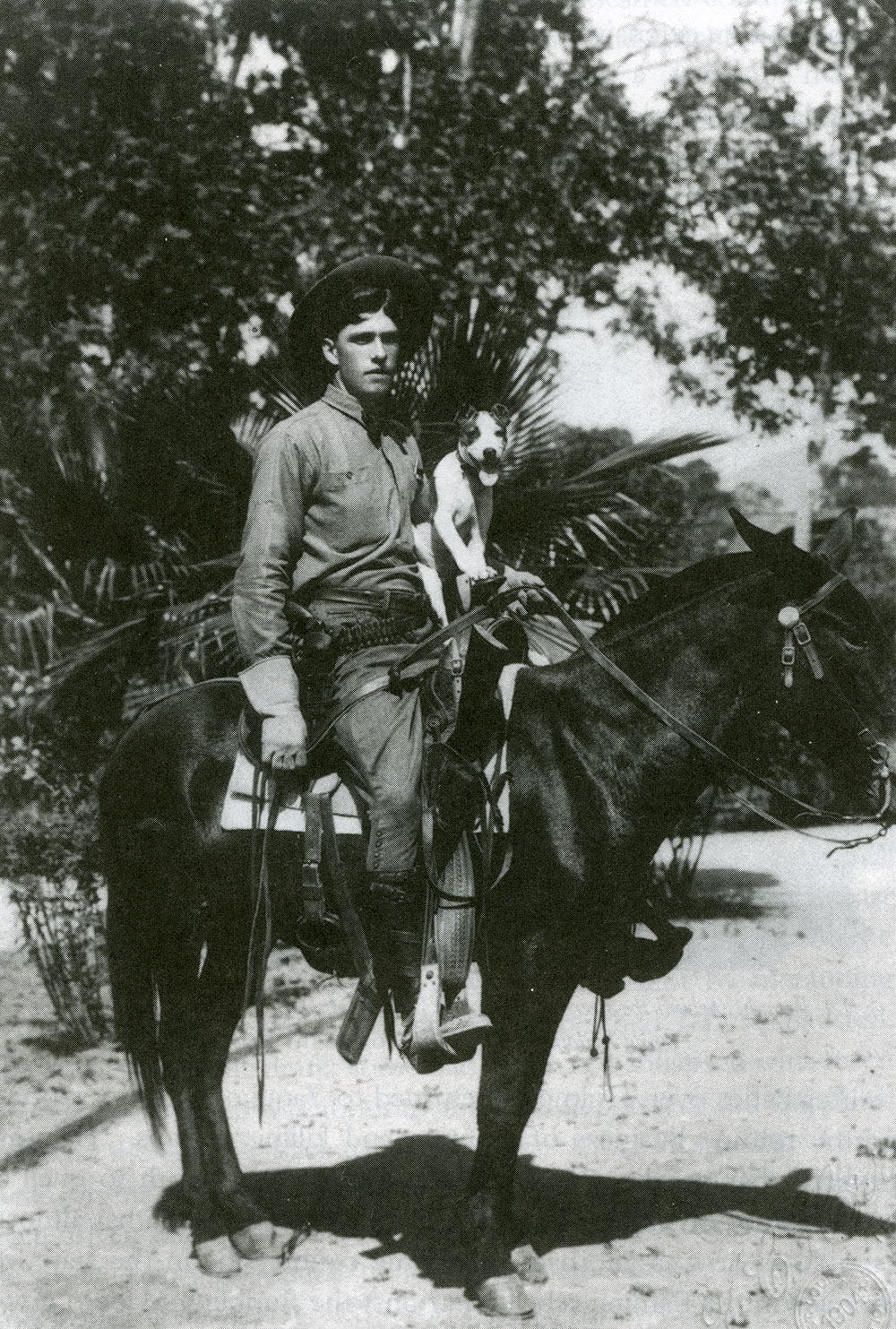
- Emil Holmdahl and his pet dog during the campaign against Zapata. c 1913
- Born: Emil Lewis Holmdahl; August 26, 1883; Fort Dodge, Iowa, US
- Died: April 8, 1963 (aged 79); Van Nuys, California, US
- Burial place: Forest Lawn Memorial Park
- Spouse(s): Ann (m. 1929, divorced 1930); Elizabeth Ellamanda Moyer (m. 1928, died 1957)
- Military career
- Allegiance: United States; Qing dynasty Honduras; Mexico: Magonistas Federales Porfiristas Maderistas Carrancistas Constitutionalists Conventionalists Villistas
- Branch: United States Army
- Service years: 1898 – 1920
- Rank: Captain (US); Colonel (Mexico); Ensign (China)
- Units: 51st Iowa Volunteer Regiment; Royal Imperial Guards, Sinim Order of Dragoons (China); 20th Infantry Regiment; 5th Cavalry Regiment (Mexico); 16th Engineer Regiment (Railway)
- Conflicts: See battles: Spanish American War; Philippine–American War; Battle of Iloilo; Battle of San Roque; Battle of Guadalupe Church; Battle of Quingua; Battles of Pulilan; Battle of Calumpit; Battle of Santo Tomas; Battle of San Fernando; Battle of Calulut; Battle of Angeles; Boxer Rebellion; Moro Rebellion; Battle of Salsona; Third Sulu Expedition; Hassan uprising; Battle of Mayhbun; First Battle of Bud Dajo; Second Battle of Bud Dajo; Battle of Tambang Market; Battle of Ipal; Battle of Palas Cotta; Banana wars; Battle of the San Juan River; Battle of La Ceiba; War of 1907; Mexican Border War; Mexican Revolution; Magonista rebellion of 1911; Raid on Mazatlán Railway; Costa Oeste Campaign; Raid on Buena Noche; Capture of Rosario; Capture of Rosamorada; Fall of Tepic; Battle of Tepic (WIA); First Battle of Agua Prieta; First Battle of Ciudad Juárez; Second Battle of Tijuana; Battle of Parque (WIA); Battle of Cuernavaca; First Battle of Rellano; Second Battle of Rellano; Battle of San Andrés (WIA); First Battle of Torreón; Battle of Chihuahua (WIA); Second Battle of Ciudad Juárez; Battle of Tierra Blanca; Battle of Zaragoza (WIA); Battle of Ojinaga; Second Battle of Torreón; Battle of Zacatecas; Battle of Celaya; Second Battle of Agua Prieta; Battle of Nogales; Yaqui Wars; Bandit War; Pancho Villa Expedition; Battle of Rubio Ranch; World War I
- Awards: Legion of Honor (Mexico); Spanish Campaign Medal; Philippine Campaign Medal; Philippine Congressional Medal; Mexican Service Medal; World War I Victory Medal
- Other work: Spy; Gun Running

Emil Ludwig "Lewis" Holmdahl (August 26, 1883– April 8, 1963) was an American soldier of fortune, infantryman, machine gunner, spy, gun runner, and treasure hunter who fought under Frederick Funston and John J. Pershing in the Spanish–American War and subsequent Philippine–American War (Philippine Insurrection), under Lee Christmas in Central America, under Francisco Madero, Pancho Villa, and Venustiano Carranza in the Mexican Revolution, and under John J. Pershing again in World War I. In 1926, Holmdahl was accused of having stolen Francisco "Pancho" Villa's head.

Born to Swedish–American immigrants on August 26, 1883 in Fort Dodge, Iowa, Holmdahl enlisted in the 51st Iowa Volunteers during the Spanish–American War, and subsequent Philippine–American War. When the rest of his regiment returned to the states, the now 16 year old Holmdahl opted to stay, joining the forces of the mercenary leader Edmund F. English to fight in China. Holmdahl reenlisted in the US Army's 20th Infantry Regiment, and spent the next several years learning jungle warfare and sharpshooting. At 22 he was one of the young sergeants in the regiment. Holmdahl returned to the US in 1906, just in time for the infamous earthquake.

Knowledgeable in jungle fighting techniques and soldiering, Holmdahl joined the mercenary troops of Lee Christmas in Honduras and Nicaragua. Christmas supported the Honduran President Manuel Bonilla against an invasion by Nicaragua in 1907 and fought to oust the Nicaraguan dictator Jose Santos Zelaya. Bonilla's counter offensive forced Nicaraguan troops to retreat. The American mercenary army led by Christmas played a major role in this action. In the fall of 1909, Zelaya left Managua. Holmdahl fought alongside, Sam Dreben and Tracy Richardson, two other American soldiers of fortune. They were highly paid and coveted as machine gun experts as the guns had recently become an important tactical weapon in warfare. The weapons were often unreliable and temperamental and those who could operate them well were almost exclusively former American soldiers.

Holmdahl returned to the United States in 1909. A severe recession in the United States that affected the Mexican economy combined with an Porfirio Díaz, an aging dictator who refused to allow free elections, created unrest all over Mexico. Holmdahl took a security job at a railroad company with the task to fight "bandits." Supposedly switching sides when he realized that the "bandits" were Insurrectos, launching the Costa Oeste Campaign against the federalist government. Holmdahl joined Francisco Madero's forces in the spring of 1911. Within months of an armed uprising that started in Chihuahua, Porfirio Díaz went into exile. Now a major, Holmdahl remained a member of the Mexican army through the spring of 1913. His first assignment took him to Morelos where he joined federal troops in a fight against Emiliano Zapata. Holmdahl also joined the Mexican Secret Service under the command of Felix A. Sommerfeld in the same period. As a machine gunner in Pancho Villa's irregulars he decimated Pascual Orozco's rebel forces, while relating important intelligence to Sommerfeld in El Paso. "We knocked the Hell out of him [Orozco] and his troops later while with Villa at San Andres where I earned the Legion of Honor medal."

When President Madero died in a coup d'état in February 1913, Holmdahl immediately joined the Constitutionalist forces under the command of Venustiano Carranza. After fighting in Sonora, the soldier of fortune was seriously injured and spent several months recovering in Douglas, Arizona. Still "thin and pale … but … cheerful," Holmdahl was assigned to Villa's forces around the beginning of November 1913. In the summer of 1914, the combined Constitutionalist forces ousted General Victoriano Huerta, who had usurped the presidency from Madero over a year prior. Not able to reconcile their differences, Pancho Villa and Venustiano Carranza split and started a new civil war in 1915. Holmdahl chose to remain with Carranza and helped smuggle arms and ammunition across the border into Mexico. Holmdahl was promptly caught, indicted, tried, and convicted in El Paso in the fall of 1915 for gunrunning. While free on bond, Holmdahl tried to re-join the US army but was rejected as a result of his felony conviction. Finally, in March 1916, in the aftermath of Pancho Villa's attack on Columbus, New Mexico, his application was approved. Holmdahl joined the Pancho Villa Expedition under the command of John J. Pershing as a scout.

As a prerequisite to join the US military permanently to fight in World War I, Holmdahl had to get his felony conviction overturned. He appealed to former commanders of his, Hugh L. Scott, by 1917 Army Chief of Staff, and John J. Pershing, the designated commander of the expeditionary forces, as well as members of Congress and the Mayor of El Paso Thomas Calloway Lea Jr. for a presidential pardon. Finally, in July 1917 Holmdahl received his pardon, joined the 6th Engineers and shipped out to France. After he returned to the US and worked selling off military surplus, Holmdahl left the US Army permanently in 1920.

In the early 1920s, Holmdahl became obsessed with finding "Pancho Villa's gold." Folklore had it that Villa hid millions of dollars in gold bullion somewhere in the Sierra Madre Mountains. Holmdahl organized several treasure hunting expeditions but did not find the gold. In 1926, while on a treasure hunting expedition, he stopped in Hidalgo del Parral, Chihuahua. There federal police arrested Holmdahl and a companion and charged them with having vandalized Pancho Villa's grave and taken his head. Holmdahl was released after Ben F. Williams utilized his knowledge of Mexican law and his influence with Mayor Antonio Martinez to issue an order for his release. Villa's head was never recovered. While Holmdahl maintained his innocence until his death, the suspicion remains that he stole the head for an American customer. While there are many theories of who vandalized Villa's grave and who took the head, one rumor claims that Villa's skull ended up in the secret Skull and Bones Society at Yale University.

Emil Holmdahl died "on April 8, 1963, while loading his automobile with his prospecting tools..." age at the age of 79.

== Early life ==
Emil Ludwig "Lewis" Holmdahl was born on August 26, 1883, in the Swedetown area of Fort Dodge, Iowa, to Swedish-American parents, Frans "Frank" Emil Holmdahl and his wife Cecelia Andrina Olson, the 6th of 7, or possibly 8, children. His siblings were Amanda Esther Holmdahl (1875–?), Andrew Licerus Holmdahl (1876–?), August Emmanuel Holmdahl (1878–?), Monville A. "Monty" Holmdahl (1879-1956), Hedvig Nathaniel "Edward" Holmdahl (1881–1955), and Minnie A. Holmdahl (1886–1968). Both of his parents were immigrants from Sweden, his father worked for the Fort Dodge Gas and Electric Company as did two of his brothers, although they lived a rural farming lifestyle. Little is known about Holmdahl's early life but he appears to be something of an adventurous but troublesome child, often getting into trouble with his school and authorities. According to Douglas V. Meed, a historian and expert on 19th and early 20th century American history, Holmdahl loved "Rudyard Kipling's stories" and tales of exotic battle. His father left home when Holmdahl was young to start a new family in California, as he had done this previously in St. Paul, Minnesota. His father's escapades may have influenced Holmdahl's extraordinary wanderlust that resulted in the life that he would lead later in life. The young Holmdahl did not get much of a formal education, although he learned to read and to write, and would be known for his "exquisite handwriting and signature".

== US military service ==
=== Spanish–American War ===
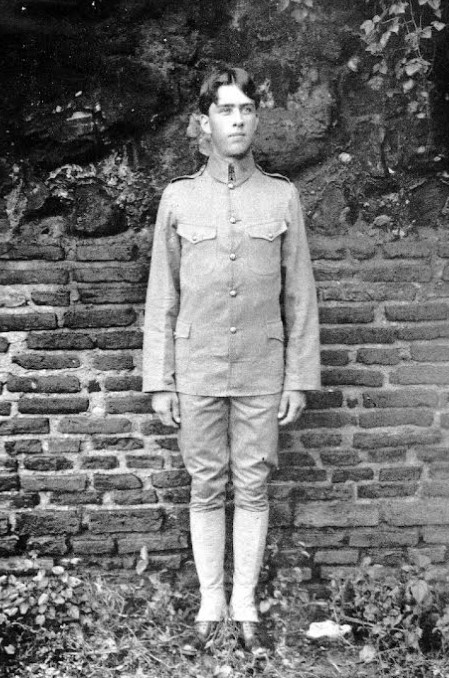
Emil Holmdahl at age 15 enlisting in the army to fight in the Spanish-American War

The Spanish–American War had broken out in 1898 shortly after the USS Maine exploded off the coast of Cuba and US president William McKinley had issued a call for arms requesting 50,000 volunteers to bolster the regular army, however the Army would eventually receive 220,000, vastly higher than the requested 50,000. Holmdahl had a new sense of adventure and patriotism and wanted to take part. Holmdahl's older brother Monty had already enlisted, but Holmdahl was only 15 years old and was 2 years off from being allowed to enlist at the minimum age of 17. Holmdahl desperately wanted to join the war however and went to a recruiting office to enlist, where a grizzled sergeant could tell he was underage and told him to wait a few years. Holmdahl was concerned the war would be over by then and so took his small amount of savings and went to a different recruiting office. He hired a man to act as his father, and had him tell the recruiters that he was of age. The plan worked and he successfully enlisted in the 51st Iowa Volunteer Infantry Regiment as a rifleman.

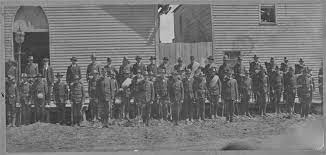
Men of the 51st Iowa Volunteer Infantry Regiment at Camp McKinley

The 51st was mustered at Des Moines, Iowa, under the command of Col. John T. Loper, and began training at Camp McKinley. In May, the regiment had received orders to travel west to San Francisco join the Philippine Campaign, and by May 30 the regiment consisted of fifty officers and 789 enlisted men. The 51st set out towards San Francisco by train in groups, with portions of the regiment leaving Des Moines on June 5, and the entire regiment arriving by 11th.

Holmdahl and the 51st were first sent to Camp Merritt and shortly afterwards to Camp Merriam at the Presidio, the military base close to the San Francisco harbor, which by now consisted of 50 officers and 1,336 enlisted men. Holmdahl and the 51st spent four and a half months training there and acclimating to life as volunteer soldiers primarily preparing for the Philippines. Morale was high among the 51st as conditions were relatively luxurious as they were able to sleep in tents with rubber blankets on bottom, wool on top, good rations, and even got to participate in football games with other units. The team from the 51st Iowa, which may have contained Holmdahl beat Berkeley, 6–0. While in California, the regiment received news of the armistice in the Philippines on August 13, 1898, immediately after the Battle of Manila, which was to the great annoyance of Holmdahl who was not happy to miss out on the "action". After months in California, the morale began to fade as disease began to make its way to the 51st, and two soldiers, Private Barton J. Brown, aged 18 and Private Louis Dunn, aged 23, died of disease. The regiment would lose 27 men to disease before even leaving for the Philippines.

=== Philippine–American War ===
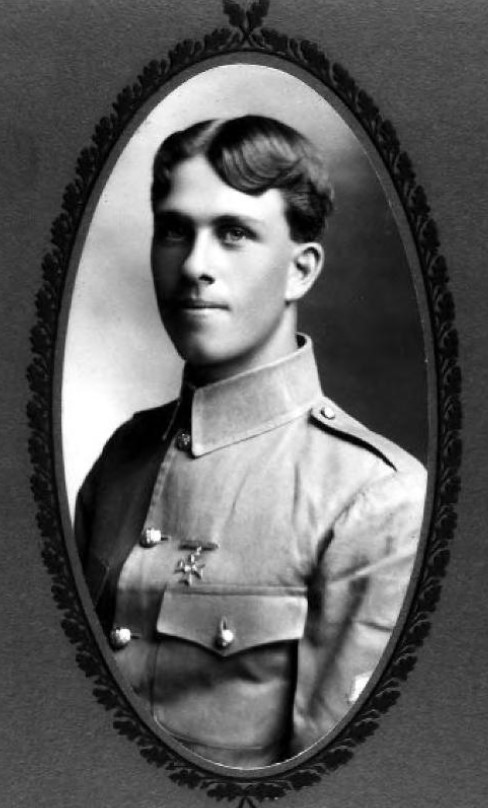
Emil Holmdahl during the Philippine Insurrection

Despite the armistice, In October the regiment had orders to sail to the Philippines for an 8 month-long deployment. The 51st broke camp on November 3 at 9 p.m and marched outside the Lombard Gate of the Presidio and boarded the transport ship SS. Pennsylvania, a hastily converted freighter with cramped quarters, inadequate ventilation, and few amenities. Most of the regiment suffered from seasickness as they set out towards Manila, which they arrived offshore on December 7 and remained on ship. On December 10, the US and Spain signed an official treaty in Paris, formally ceding the Philippines to the US, much to the outrage of the Filipino locals who wished for an independent Philippine. The regiment then finally received orders to land on the port city of Iloilo on the island of Panay. The 51st on the Pennsylvania sailed out of Manila Bay on December 26, escorted by the cruiser Baltimore and two troop ships and would raise anchor offshore of Iloilo on the same day. It soon became apparent that occupying Iloilo would not be as easy as it seems as local Filipino insurgents took control over the island and occupied Iloilo. Eight days later, the regiment received orders to attack and capture the city. Holmdahl and the 51st began preparing for their first battle by sharpening their bayonets and cleaning their outdated .45-70 Springfield rifles. Holmdahl and the 51st, alongside units of the 6th U.S. Field Artillery, climbed down from the sides of the Pennsylvania and were transported on to the beach. The Filipinos had fortified and barricaded the coast and were in a highly defensible position and after a brief wait, Colonel Loper decided to abandon the attack and the 51st and company returned to their ship. They were next sent to Cavite, near Manila where they were finally allowed to go into quarters on February 3.

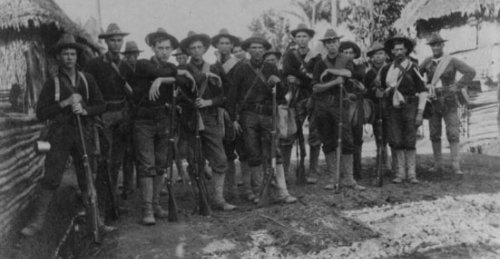
51st Iowa Volunteers Regiment in the Philippines

The Philippine–American War formally began on February 4 when Private William Walter Grayson of the First Nebraska Volunteer Infantry fired at men carrying rifles, igniting the Second Battle of Manila. On February 9, 1899, the 51st advanced being making preparation for their first engagement, their objective was to advance on San Roque, southwest of Manila and nearby Cavite. They had initially suspected Cavite would be attacked by the Filipinos from San Roque, so waited until no attack came and then fortified the town and then, alongside the Wyoming Light Battery and the Nevada Cavalry, with Batteries A and D of the California Heavy Artillery defeated the Filipinos on the cause way of San Roque. They next went east where on March 5 they fought in the Battle of Guadalupe Church under the command of Brig. Gen. Loyd Wheaton. Shortly afterwards, the 51st were transferred to the Second Brigade, Second Division of the same Corps on April 14, where they took part in the general advance against the Filipinos to the north of Manila, arriving at Malolos a day later on April 15. Holmdahl and the rest of his regiment later took part in the Battle of Quingua and Battles of East and West Pulilan on April 24.

The next day on the 25th Holmdahl and his regiment fought at the Bagbag River during the first of two Battles of Calumpit. The 51st then proceeded to play a major role during the Battle of Santo Tomas on May 4. The 51st and other units successfully captured San Fernando during May 4-5th. Following this, Holmdahl and his unit fought in many different skirmishes around San Fernando from May 15 to July 4. The 2nd battalion was finally given orders to and take Angeles, north of San Fernando, and on August 9, they advanced to Calulut, which fell and then on the same day. The 51st began fighting around Angeles, but then were assigned guard duty at Calulut, while Angeles would eventually fall on November 5, 1899. The Battle of Angeles was considered to be the longest in the history of the Philippine–American War in Pampanga. The 51st served their guard duty until September 6, where having completed their 8-month deployment they returned to Manila and went into their quarters at Cuartel de Espafia. The 51st Iowa Volunteers had 47 enlisted men killed in action, 22 officer and 331 enlisted wounded, 34-39 men dead of disease (not including the 27 dead before leaving California), 1 officer committed suicide, while only one deserted. Holmdahl, instead of returning to San Francisco via the transport Senator, chose to remain in the Philippines, as he was still yearning for adventure.

=== Qing Royal Guard and Boxer Rebellion ===
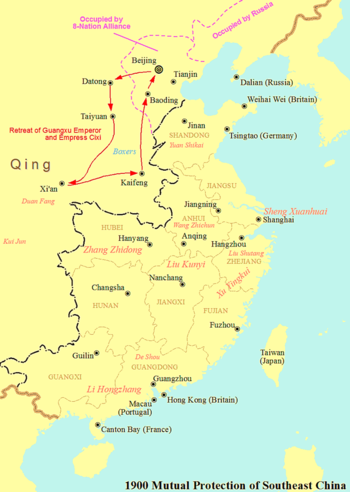
Map of China during Boxer Rebellion

The now 16 year old Holmdahl then joined with the forces of mercenary "General" Edmund F. English, who was recruiting a foreign legion of experienced soldiers to help modernize the army of Qing Dynasty, with the backing of the Chinese Empire Reform Association, a group of western-oriented China men and San Francisco businessmen. Their Mission was to aid Empress Tzu Hsi, in putting down a series of rebellions. The men recruited by English were described by Meed as "discharged soldiers, wharf-rats, and European Freebooters" and formed the regiment known as the Royal Imperial Guards, Sinim Order of Dragoons, which would serve as both shock troops and royal bodyguards. Holmdahl was commissioned in the regiment as an ensign, possibly due to his "exquisite hand writing and flair for expressing himself". The regiment, having successfully recruited a decent force set sail for China. The regiment arrived at the Shanghai harbor just in time for the situation to increase tenfold.

Many Chinese were angered by the involvement of foreigners in Chinese affairs, and dissent began to grow. They eventually decided they had had enough and united, later forming a group, known by the Europeans as the "Boxers". They began to attack and kill foreigners by the hundreds, initiating the Boxer Rebellion, a collection of foreign states to fight the boxers. The Boxers forced Empress Tzu Hsi to sever relation with the foreigners, and this left the regiment without money, and the men quickly dissolved into a collection of drifters in Shanghai. Luckily for Holmdahl, he had managed to win a ticket back to the Philippines.

=== Insurgents and Moro Rebellion ===
Now back in the Philippines, Holmdahl heard news that the military was offering a $500 enlistment bonus to enlist in the regular army, so Holmdahl enlisted in the 20th Infantry Regiment as a private in company I. The regulars had benefits over the volunteers, as they had access to the modern Norwegian-designed Krag-Jorgensen bolt-action rifle, which had a five-shot magazine, fired a high velocity .30-40 caliber cartridge, and used smokeless powder, which the volunteer standard .45-70 Springfield rifle did not. The gun also had a range of 2,000 yards (1,800 m), and Holmdahl quickly established himself as an excellent marksman. The regular army also had the added benefit of better gear, equipment, and rations, while pay was guaranteed. Holmdahl and his unit fought in a short, but fierce skirmish at Salsona, Luzon. In November 1901, Holmdahl's unit was put under the command of General J. Franklin Bell and were given the task of pacifying the remaining insurgents still resisting American dominion.

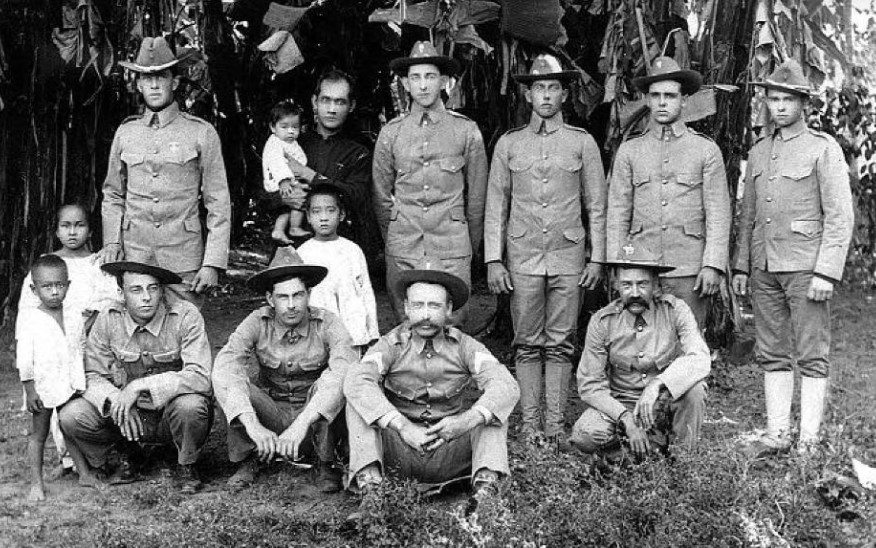
Sgt Holmdahl (Far left, standing) during Moro Rebellion with men of the 20th Infantry

Holmdahl and the 20th were sent to Jolo island to help secure the island, and then to Jolo City itself, where they would take part in the Third Sulu Expedition against the Sultanate of Sulu. The war was brutal with large scale atrocities on both sides. The Philippine insurrection was officially declared over by president Theodore Roosevelt, and soon evolved into the bloody Moro Rebellion

After a series of short but brutal battles, Holmdahl had distinguished himself, and was promoted to corporal as well as earning a certificate that declared him proficient in the Drill Regulations of 1904. The war took a more personal turn Holmdahl, when four of his friends in the 20th including Sergeant John McDermott were brutally killed in the village of Talai, while another was wounded.

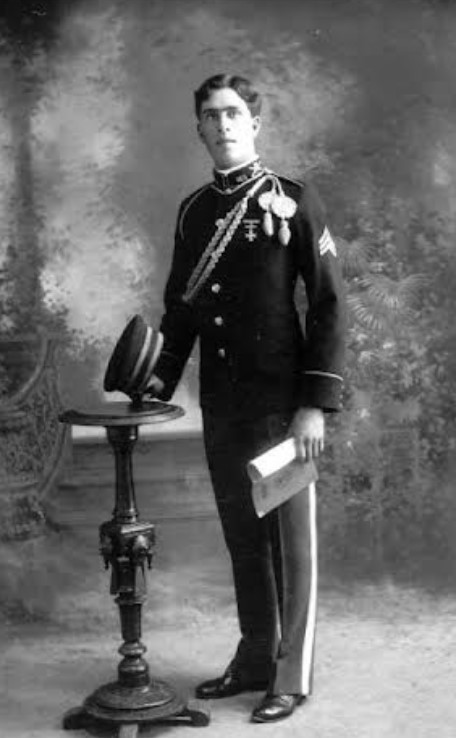
Sgt Holmdahl in full dress uniform, while in the Philippines

Holmdahl next fought against Datu Hassan, the youngest son of the Great Raja Muda Ammang, during the Hassan uprising. In April 1905, Datto Pala, the chief of Sulu, invaded Jolo during the Battle of Mayhbun. Pala's attack failed, with 250 men, including Pala himself, being killed; while only 7 Americans were killed and 20 wounded. In March, Holmdahl fought during the First Battle of Bud Dajo.The now 21 one year old Holmdahl then fought in the Battles of Tambang Market, Ipal, and Palas Cotta, during which he earned much renown and recognition. Holmdahl's service records had a note stating "this soldier has a military ability and zeal to fit him for a commission as an officer a unit of United States volunteers". Holmdahl would be promoted to Sergeant of Company I on December 15, at only age 22.

In March 1906, the 20th infantry would finally return to the US aboard the troopship USS Sheridan. Holmdahl having served eight months in the 51st Iowa Volunteers and six years in the 20th while in the Philippines. Throughout the years of combat in the Far East, Holmdahl had become an expert marksman, a dare devil counter-insurgency fighter, and committed to a soldier's career. Holmdahl had also learned valuable skills on machine gunning, which would prove greatly beneficial later in life.

=== San Francisco earthquake ===
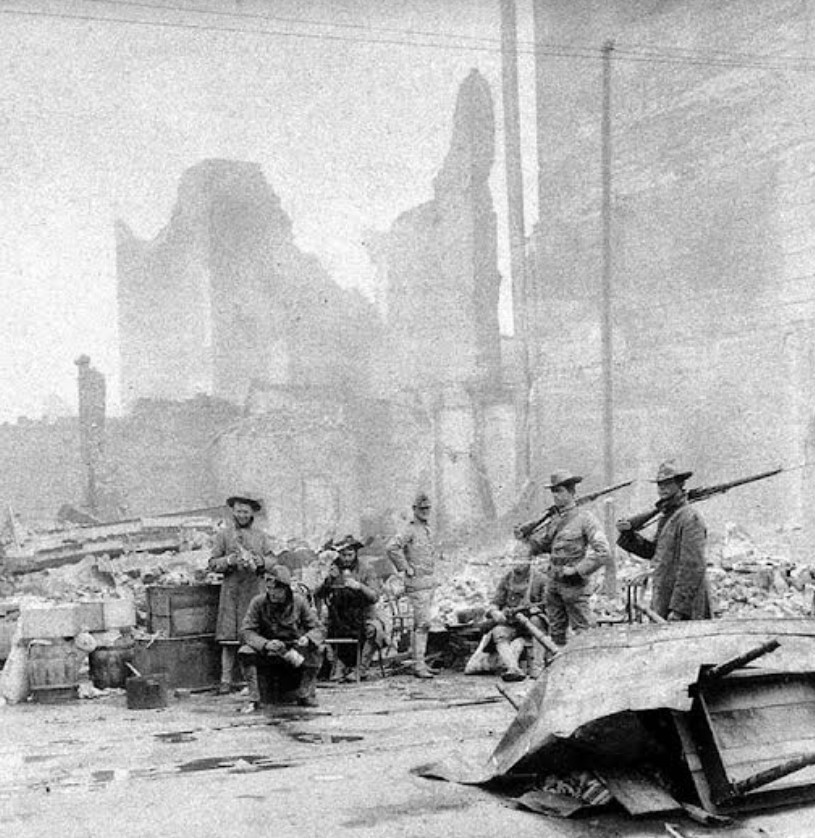
U.S soldiers on guard duty amid the ruins of San Francisco, 1906 (Holmdahl is second from right)

Having returned to San Francisco, he began to enjoy the pleasures of the infamous Barbary Coast red light district, while on leave from his post at Monterey. This was not to last as within a month of arriving in California, a massive 7.9 magnitude tremendous earthquake and subsequent fires virtually destroyed San Francisco on April 18, 1906. Holmdahl was eventually able to get to his duty station at Monterey, where he was immediately sent back to the front lines of the smoldering remains of the city to rescue residents and maintain order, mainly from looters. "It was worse than soldiering in the Philippine Islands. I was on guard at the United States Sub Treasury Building for 125 hours with little sleep," Holmdahl commented on his service in San Francisco.

The troops were withdrawn after order was successfully brought to the destroyed city. Holmdahl and the rest of the 20th returned to their posts at Monterey, during which Holmdahl would on free time from his usual duties, play baseball. He was quite good as on Thanksgiving Day he played second base for a team of enlisted which beat officers 12–2, while on December 6 he was winning pitcher on the Company I team which defeated Company H, and finally on December 13 he pitched for the team that beat Monterey High School.

Holmdahl received an honorary discharge on January 31, 1907.

== Central America ==
=== Oakland Steamfitter and Banana Wars ===
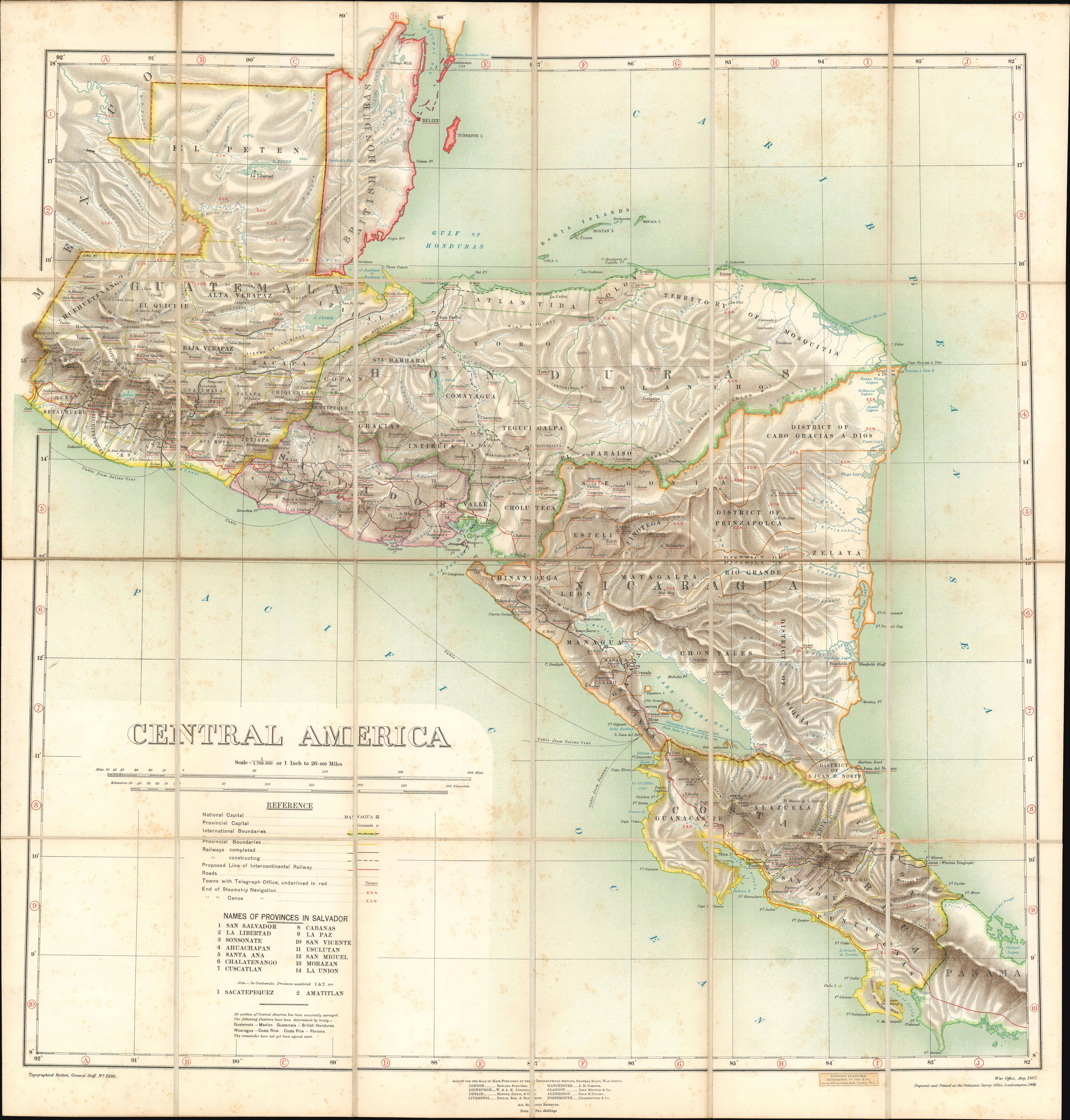
Map of Central America 1908

Immediately following his discharge Holmdahl moved to Oakland, California, where he worked as a steamfitter, installing and maintaining pipes. He only spent only two weeks at his new job as he was left dissatisfied and bored. The life of a steamfitter was nowhere near as exciting as during his time overseas and he resolved to once again find a profession where he could see action and have an adventure.

Much of his personal actions during this time are unknown, as no written sources exist, however it is known that Holmdahl was certainly involved in the many wars and revolutions, but how or when is not. Holmdahl was probably recruited in either Oakland or in San Francisco and made his way to New Orleans on the Gulf of Mexico. Once there he boarded a banana boat and made his way to the Nicaraguan port city of Bluefields, where he made his way to Honduras through "tick-infested mountains" and "malaria-ridden jungles" and from where he joined the forces of American mercenary "General" Lee Christmas.

=== Service under Lee Christmas ===
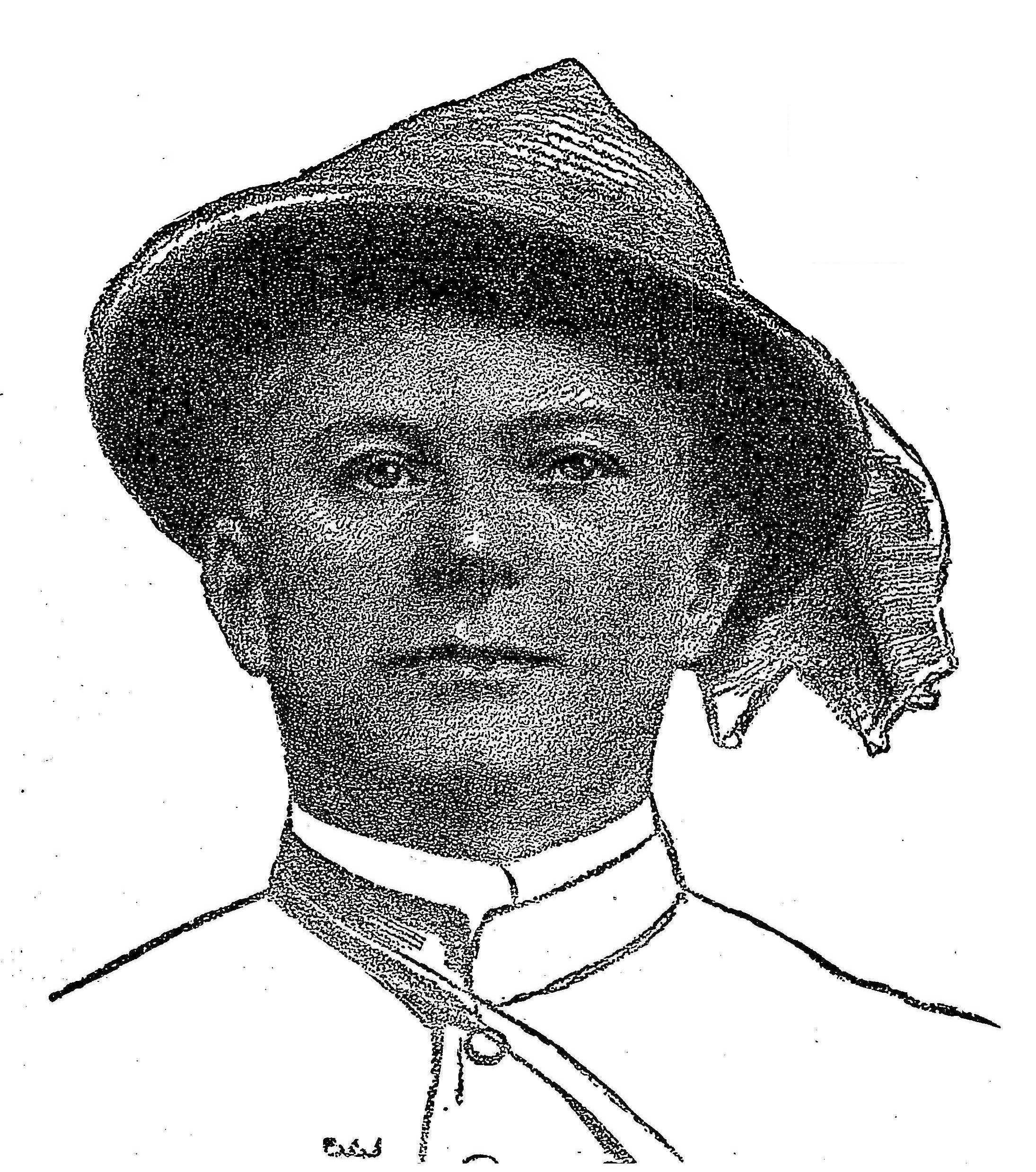
General Lee Christmas in Central America

Lee Christmas was a Louisiana native and railroad man who eventually traveled to Honduras and later became a mercenary, enthusiastically supporting the revolutionary and future president, Manuel Bonilla. He would later become a high ranking officer and commander of Bonillas army leading a large group of American mercenaries, which now included Holmdahl. Lee Christmas was in need of men with skill who could operate the new machine guns which were recently brought to central America by foreigners. During 1907 the dictator of Nicaragua, José Santos Zelaya invaded Honduras to establish his own man, Miguel Dávila to the presidency. Holmdahl probably fought alongside Christmas and Bonilla during the invasion, and during a 1907 battle with Christmas against Zelaya. The arrival of machine guns by the Nicaraguas tipped the war in Zelaya's favor and Bonilla and Christmas went into exile.

Holmdahl may have fled back to New Orleans alongside Christmas or continued fighting in various conflicts throughout the region; he possibly fought in the War of 1907 between El Salvador on one side and Nicaragua and Dávila's Honduras on one side. When Christmas invaded Honduras yet again to oust Dávila, Holmdahl likely took part in that campaign. The war lasted little over a year before Christmas and Bonilia defeated Dávila and retook control of Honduras.

=== Invasion of Nicaragua ===
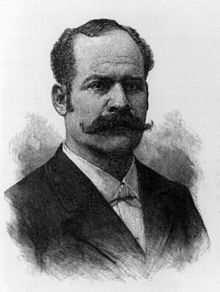
Jose Santos Zelaya, President of Nicaragua

Holmdahl and others mercenaries next went into Nicaragua to remove Zelaya from power supported by Bonilia, Christmas, and possibly the United States government who were unhappy with Zelaya who was considering constructing a canal across the Nicaragua isthmus, which would compete with the Panama canal being worked on by the Americans. Holmdahl probably took part in the fighting alongside the San Juan River, where two American mercenaries, Lee Roy Cannon and Leonard Groce were captured and later executed by firing squad which only inspired more Americans to come to join the conflict. Christmas at some point promoted Holmdahl to an officer according to a 1913 interview.

During this time Holmdahl became acquainted with other legendary soldiers of fortunes and mercenaries, Sam Dreben "the fighting Jew", who would fight in dozens of wars and would become one of the most decorated Americans during WW1. Tracy Richardson, "The World's Greatest Machine Gunner", who single-handedly captured the city of Managua and would fight in WW1 for the Canadians, and the Americans in WW2. Edward "Tex" O'Reilly, who fought in dozens of wars and later became a famous war correspondent. Guy "Machine Gun" Maloney, who left home at age 16 to fight in the Boer War and would become a Colonel in the US army.

There is evidence to suggest Holmdahl fought in Cuba and Venezuela, and he may have returned to central America to fight during the 1910 Invasion of Honduras, and unquestionably during the 1911 invasion and the resulting Battle of La Ceiba, which made Lee Christmas famous.

A story in the EL Paso Times later reported that Holmdahl made his way to New Orleans and then...

...joined a filibuster expedition...for South America with a shipload of ammunition. The ship circled Cape Horn and landed its cargo at Mazanillo, in the Mexican state of Colima. The soldier of fortune then went to Los Angeles where he joined a junta planning a revolt in Mexico.

In 1909, the 26 year old Holmdahl decided to return to the US.

== Early involvement in Mexico ==
=== Magonist Revolt and spy mission ===
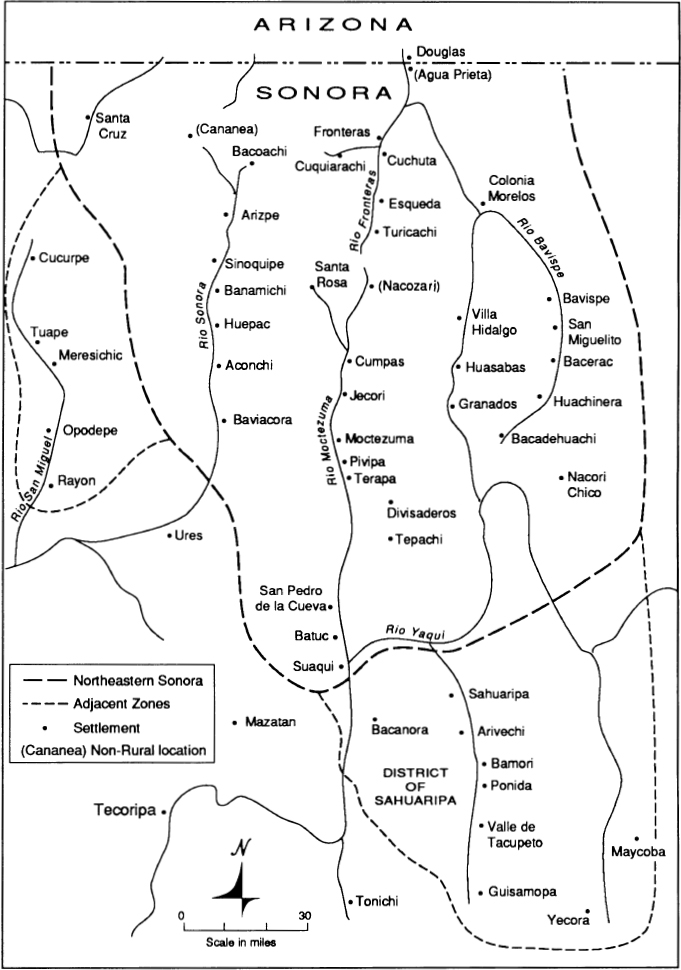
Map of Sonora, North Western Mexico 1911

Mexico had been in an ongoing form of instability and political anarchy due to many factors, among them the ironfist rule of dictator Porfirio Díaz. Holmdahl's first actions are unknown, but he likely went into Mexico immediately following returning from Central America and probably became a member of the growing Magonist movement under the leadership of Ricardo Flores Magón.

Upon his return to the states, Holmdahl answered an ad that simply read "Wanted: Man with military experience, who had nerve and is single". Holmdahl listed his military experience and was invited to attend many midnight interviews in the shady side of town, after which he received an envelope containing a $100 bill and brought to meet several Mexican revolutionaries who were plotting against the Díaz regime. Holmdahl was asked to smuggle arms and ammunition into Mexico, while posing as a mining expert.

Holmdahl was given "plenty of money" and a revolver by the revolutionary junta and traveled to Nogales, Arizona, where he crossed the border and boarded a train for 500 hundred-miles south to the city of Culiacán, the capital of Sinaloa. He purchased a horse and saddle and went south on the "tortilla trail"; it got its name as there's nothing to eat except the tortillas you brought with you. After the 100 miles trek across the plain, Holmdahl arrived at the west coastal port city of Mazatlán where he made contacts and spent his spare time improving his Spanish, before finally traveling to the revolutionary objective of Tepic, the capital of Nayarit.

Holmdahl, acting as a wealthy representative of a New York mining company had managed to gain entry to the governor's palace by telling the governor that he was interested in purchasing "good property" and promised "good money" that would be available in exchange for help. Holmdahl was easily able to charm the governor, who invited him back for dinner. Now having secured the governor's confidence, he was able to learn the number of men and amount of arms and ammunition of the pro-Díaz forces, while the governor at point even showed Holmdahl the location of where some of the secret ammo and weapons were. Holmdahl forwarded this message to the revolutionary junta back in Los Angeles. Bad news came to Holmdahl when several revolutionaries and spies were arrested and then promptly executed, which the governor said was to "put fear in the people"".

Holmdahl, on the pretext of surveying timberland on the coast spent nine days searching for potential landing spots for which he could smuggle arms and ammunition into Mexico by sea. Once Holmdahl returned to the capital a man told him that the governor had been tipped off that he was a spy, and told him he should gather his things and leave. Holmdahl apprehensively returned to his room to gather his belongings, but once he reached his room he noticed that the Mexican Rurale police had surrounded the building. Holmdahl successfully snuck into the hotel patio and then used his leather lariat to lasso an overhanging water spout and managed to pull himself up. Holmdahl began escaping the town by jumping across rooftops until he reached the end and lowered himself to the ground, but by sheer coincidence ran to a dozen policemen. The police too were surprised and Holmdahl swiftly withdrew his revolver and killed a policeman with a single shot to the head.

Holmdahl began a fighting retreat as he ran towards the stables where he hoped he could find the fastest steed in the city. Holmdahl did just that and rode out onto the street, while the Rurales with horses of their own began a pursuit. Holmdahl noticed a crowd and rode into them as he had hoped the Rurales would not fire into a crowd of people. The Rurales had little regard for the people who they were supposed to serve and fired into the crowd anyway. Bullets came close to Holmdahl on several occasions while many civilians were killed and even more wounded by the Rurales.

Holmdahl would later write

"A fat priest came out of the church and waved his hands at me. I fired not at him, but at the stained glass window just above his head, and shattered the glass. If you ever saw a scared fat priest make a quick retreat that 'toad' made grand time. I bet he called me a few things not in the Good Book"

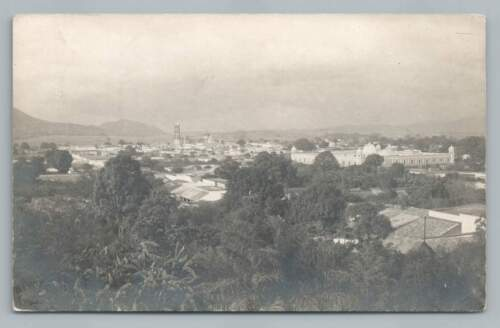
Tepic, Sonora Mexico 1909

Holmdahl continued fleeing down the cobbled street and was able to outrun the police due to his horse being faster than that of the Rurales, however just as he was leaving the town the Rurales fired a final volley which injured his horse. Holmdahl then went over into a corral where he stole a horse from a local rancher. With the new horse he was able to escape his pursuers, and for four days he lived off the land, stole horses, and slept in the saddle, until he reached a hot spring, near the village of Tuxpán, where feeling drowsy and ill he chose to dismount and fall asleep. Holmdahl was awoken by a Mauser carbine coming down upon his foot, and he jokingly told the Rurale Commander "Some race, huh", to which the Rurale Commander responded "Your gringo sense of humor is replaced." Holmdahl was cuffed and then stabbed in his leg with a knife. Holmdahl initially suspected he was to be hanged as a rope was placed around his neck, but then was given to a Sergeant who hitched it to his saddle.

Holmdahl was dragged 10 miles through the desert and taken to the town of Rosamorada. Holmdahl was badly treated by his captors and was badly beaten and strangled before being taken to a prison cell. That same night a Díaz agent arrived, accompanied by a priest, presented Holmdahl with a written confession and was ordered to sign. When Holmdahl refused to do so he received stinging slaps to the face. The priest asked Holmdahl what his religion was and Holmdahl responded "I have none and you can go to hell." When the priest made his way to return outside the cell, Holmdahl, whose feet were not tied, kicked the priest in the stomach. For this act of immense courage Holmdahl would be knocked out with a rifle slammed against his head.

Holmdahl was awoken several hours later by a friendly guard who told him if he signed they would have shot him. In the early hours of the next morning, the guard untied Holmdahl and the two sneaked out of the jail where they stole horses and fled to the mountains. Holmdahl ran across a group of laborers repairing a bridge, where he borrowed a gun, flour, and sugar from the American foreman before retreating back to the mountains.

=== Sonoran Rural Police and Border War ===
Upon returning back from the mountains, Holmdahl had somehow managed to receive a commission as a captain in the Sonoran Rural Police by the infamous "Iron fist of Porfirio Díaz", Colonel Emilio Kosterlitzky. Holmdahl was probably commissioned to report on illegal rebel activity and to disrupt rebel meetings. Despite this, Holmdahl was acting as a double agent against the Diaz regime from the beginning, a very dangerous game for a man as powerful as Kosterlitzky. Holmdahl would likely participate in the ongoing Border War with Mexico, with Holmdahl acting as a security agent on the side of the American Railroad companies.

=== Security job and Mazatlán Railway ===
Holmdahl next got a job as border security for an American railroad company, operating near Mazatlán, Mexico. Holmdahl was given the task of guarding the gold shipments due to his military experience, where he recruited a force of 200 men, which would escort the shipments through bandit country. Bandits attempted numerous times to raid the gold shipments, but Holmdahl intercepted them each time with ruthless efficiency never leaving "a man alive" and soon the desert was littered with the dead rotting in the sun.

One time however his camp was raided and more than 100 horses were stolen. Holmdahl immediately raised a large party to hunt the raiders and easily tracked down the bandits and stolen horses, and was able to surround the "bandits", who surrendered immediately. Holmdahl quickly realized these men were not the typical "bandits", but rather peasants due to their appearance and Holmdahl demanded of them "Why did you fools steal my horses and why should I not hang you?". The peasants began explaining how they served General Francisco I. Madero, who was attempting to liberate them from the cruel clutches of Díaz, and needed the horses not for themselves but for the people.

Holmdahl, a Maderist sympathizer not only listened to their tale and story, but to the surprise of both the rebels and his men, he allowed them to go free and joined their cause. Holmdahl resigned his job at the railway, took his pay in horses and took command of the small band of peasants.

== Campaign against Díaz ==
=== Costa Oeste Campaign ===
Holmdahl recruited even more men to join his cause and created a new faction, the Holmdahlist who neither served Francisco Madero or the federal government. Holmdahl marched throughout the Mexican countryside and through impoverished villages and towns, which soon shouted out "Vámonos a Holmdahl" ("Let's go with Holmdahl"). Holmdahl's forces attacked and captured many west coast villages in early 1911, which were held by small garrison of federalist troops. Holmdahl was able to take control of most of Nayarit. Holmdahl had next decided to make preparations to capture the provincial capital of Tepic, where he had previously been imprisoned.

Tepic had a large garrison and strong fortifications, so Holmdahl decided to instigate a jailbreak, however the plan turned into a complete disaster as he was betrayed by deserters and lured into an ambush where many of his men were killed or captured, while 300 rebels were executed shortly afterwards and Holmdahl retreated to the hills.

=== Raid on Buena Noche ===
Holmdahl established a stronghold deep in the mountains following his defeat at Tepic, and only a few weeks later he began making preparations to raid the Buena Noche Mine near Rosario, where he hoped to steal enough dynamite to start a bomb factory from where he could launch an attack upon Rosario itself. With a band of 22 men Holmdahl raided the mine, where he stole 27 cases of dynamite.

Holmdahl started a bomb factory at his mountain hideout, and when enough were constructed he was ready to attack Rosario.

=== Martín Espinosa and Rosario ===
Martín Espinosa had taken advantage of the ongoing revolution to create a separate faction semi-loyal to the cause Francisco Madero. On May 8, Espinosa fought a battle with pro Diaz forces at La Bayona, on the south side of the Cañas River, and the following day captured Tecuala on May 9, and soon began making preparations to capture Rosario, although he lacked the dynamite to do so.

Holmdahl meanwhile was also preparing to capture Rosario, but lacked the necessary manpower. Holmdahl and Espinosa decided to join forces as each had what the other wanted. The two launched an attack upon Rosario, which fell with ease.

=== Capture of Rosamorada ===
Holmdahl and Espinosa decided to continue working together, and with a force numbering 3,000 men, they launched an attack upon Rosamorada, where Holmdahl had been imprisoned. Their makeshift army lightly armed, some with only machetes descended upon the town and after a few days of hard fighting the town fell. Holmdahl was disappointed to learn to priest who had previously visited his cell had fled the town before the attack.

Espinosa ordered the captured troops to be executed to appease his army, although they demanded the 700 prisoners in the cells be released. Holmdahl soon realized that only a few were political prisoners, while the rest were murderers, rapists, and thieves. Holmdahl turned to the mob and told them the prisoners would be released in the morning as soon as new clothing and funds could be accumulated to give them a new start in life. Holmdahl next went to Espinosa with the predicament that the prisoners would let loose a terror of rape, murder and theft; if they did not many of their troops would desert in the morning. While Espinosa and his staff pondered, Holmdahl, always the practical man came up with a solution. "Why not", he said, "look at the prison book, find out who are the worst murderers, take them out at midnight and shoot them. We won't use regular soldiers for the firing squad, we'll use officers." Espinosa agreed and 112 of the worst killers were selected for execution, and six officers were selected to be the firing squad. The criminals were told that if they marched to the town of Acaponeta and joined the rebel cause, they would be pardoned. The thugs were led out in small groups with an officer escort and were halted at a cemetery and then were promptly shot. "This kept us busy the whole night" Holmdahl wrote.

The next morning 500 of the least noxious prisoners were released, while the army cheered. They were given new clothes and five pesos to start a new life. When it was noticed that a few prisoners were missing, Espinosa casually remarked that they had been transferred to an army unit at Acaponeta. Holmdahl would later write "Many of the freed turned out to be fine citizens but others later had to executed after a military court martial."

=== Fall of Tepic ===
Holmdahl and Espinosa spent a while cleaning up coastal towns still loyal to Diaz and once most towns had surrendered, Espinosa and Holmdahl entered the provincial capital of Tepic. The federals did not often any resistance to the rebels and soon evacuated the city, while Holmdahl and Espinosa marched into the city and captured it. General Espinosa began to ensconced himself and a growing entourage in the governor's palace and was clearly beginning to plot against Madero.

=== Battle of Tepic ===
Holmdahl and seven officers were brought before Espinosa, who asked them to join his Junta. They refused and then wisely fled to the mountains, from where they joined 280 Cora Indians loyal to Madero. Holmdahl, the seven officers, and the Indians attacked Tepic, armed with bows and arrows and an old brass cannon.

Espinosa and his forces numbering between 2,000 and 5,000 men while his men were armed with guns. Holmdahl had presumed that Espinosa's men would defect and join their cause. They did not and the battle erupted into a brutal fight on the city streets. Holmdahl and his outnumbered men began to lose ground, while Holmdahl was wounded by a shell that burst near him killing the man next to him. After 36 hours of fighting, Holmdahl's forces were defeated with 2/3 of their men dead including all 7 officers.

== Fighting under Francisco Madero ==
=== Agua Prieta and Ciudad Juárez ===
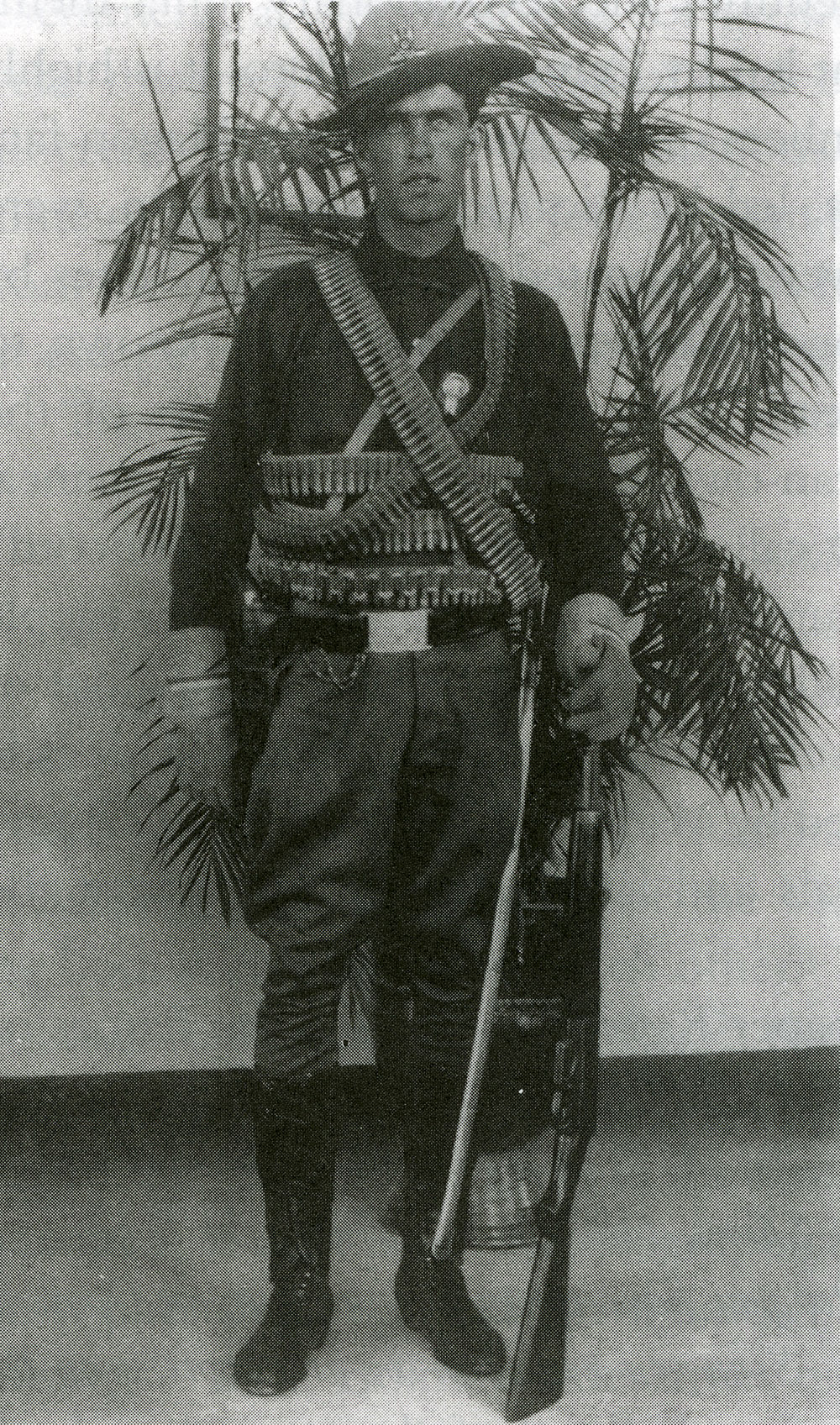
Holmdahl in the regalia of an insurgent fighter, c. 1911

Holmdahl quickly recovered from his wounds at Tepic and led his battered force to join Francisco Madero in the spring of 1911. Holmdahl joined Madero's forces in the First Battle of Agua Prieta, where the Maderistas supported by the United States were briefly able to secure the town of Agua Prieta, before it was recaptured two weeks later, although the primary objective of creating a distraction was successful. Holmdahl joined Madero's forces outside of Ciudad Juárez just in time for the attack.

Holmdahl by now deeply committed to Madero's cause joined Generals Pancho Villa and Pascual Orozco in launching an assault on the city without consulting Madero and blamed it on a "spontaneous" outbreak in fighting. The incident that served as an excuse for the offensive occurred when a federal officer insulted a female rebel on a bridge between Ciudad Juárez and El Paso. Madero attempted to halt the violence but Orozco and Villa pressed on. Both of them went to great lengths to avoid Madero so they would not have to disobey a direct order. Even when Villa was eventually confronted by Castulo Herrera with explicit instructions to stop fighting, he simply ignored him. Likewise, when Madero finally managed to see Orozco in person, he was simply told that the battle was already raging and it was too late to stop it. Orozco attacked in the north and Villa in the south. Both of them led their troops parallel to the US border so that neither their shots, nor those of the town's garrison were likely to cross on to the American side. In fact, several thousand American civilians had gathered in El Paso in order to watch the struggle as spectators, and after three days of fighting the town fell.

=== Captain of Juárez and further operations ===
Porfirio Diaz was sent into exile following the defeat, and Madero became the president of Mexico, while Diaz would remark "Madero has unleashed tigers. Let us see if he can control them". Holmdahl, for his part was named Captain of Juárez, in charge of the rural garrison in the city. In May and June, Holmdahl fought alongside troops loyal to Madero in the states of Sonora, Sinaloa, Jalisco, and Tepic on Mexico's western coast. These were campaigns against the Flores Magon, who were rebelling against Madero's government, and to whom Holmdahl had previously served. On June 22, Holmdahl took part in the recapture of Tijuana.

=== Yaqui Wars and good samaritan ===
The Yaqui's just as the Flores Magon had done revolted against Madero's government and began attacking military outpost throughout the country. Holmdahl soon met his new commanding officer, General Benjamin Viljoen, who had been appointed Commissioner to the tribe. Captain Holmdahl was ordered to accompany Viljoen with his men in an attempt to create peace with the Yaqui natives in Guaymas on the Pacific Coast. Arriving at the tropical seaport, Viljoen and Holmdahl had an unsatisfactory meeting with the Yaquis, who refused to disarm. After another series of negotiations some land was returned to them and several hundred tribes men were repatriated from the Yucatan. This was not enough however and the tribesmen continued to raid Mexican and American owned farms. Viljoen under heavy criticism soon resigned and left the country, while Holmdahl began fighting the Yaqui's with his Rurales, and would patrol the rugged terrain of the Yaqui Valley alongside a few Pima scouts and regular units of the old Diaz, now Madero army.

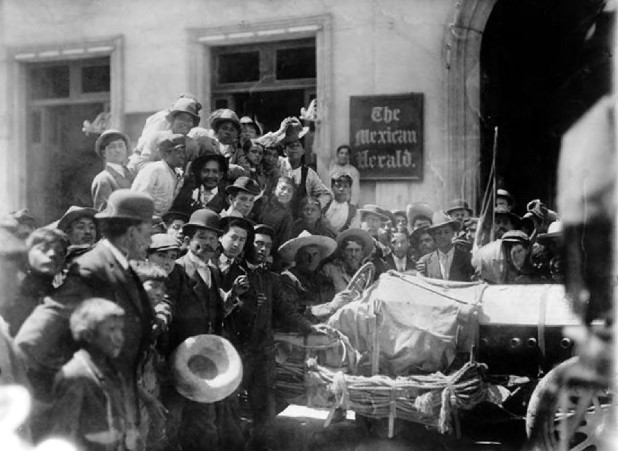
T.J Beaudit (Behind the steering wheel) and Emil Holmdahl in front of the Mexican Herald Building, 1912

In February 1912, a brief interlude in the fighting occurred which caused the Cadillac Automobile Company to come up with the plan to gain publicity for a new model. The plan involved for a 3,000-mile drive from Los Angeles to Mexico City. An international known race driver named T.J. Beaudit and a mechanic were assigned to make the trek. They drove to San Francisco, crossed into Baja California and was somehow managed to avoid Yaqui warbands and cross the Sonoran desert. In Sinaloa they were nearly shot by rebels and were robbed by bandits, and would reach Tepic exhausted. There the mechanic drank bad water and collapsed from fever and had to return to the US, and Beaudit was ready to return to the US as well and abandon the project. Holmdahl at the head of a party of mounted men encountered Beaudit, who after he told Holmdahl the tales of his woes, decided to secure a military leave and agreed to accompany the driver as guide and mechanic. With the proper military passes, the two drove through the rugged country another 500 miles to Mexico City. When the two arrived in the capitol, newspapers photographer's flashbulbs recorded the historic event, and both American and Mexican newspapers and journals wrote extensively of the daring driver and his soldier guide. On March 1, a massive luncheon was held for Beaudit and Holmdahl at the St. Francis Hotel.

Mexico City English language newspaper The Daily Mexican wrote:

"The honored guest was E.L. Holmdahl, the young machinist and guide who piloted Mr. Beaudit through the jungles and mountains from Tepic to this city."

Festivities over, Holmdahl returned to Yaqui county to continue the routine business of hunting down and killing Indians. He despised the job and considered his task "distasteful" and was happy when he had been given a new task to quell a more serious revolt.

=== Zapata Revolt and promotion to Major ===
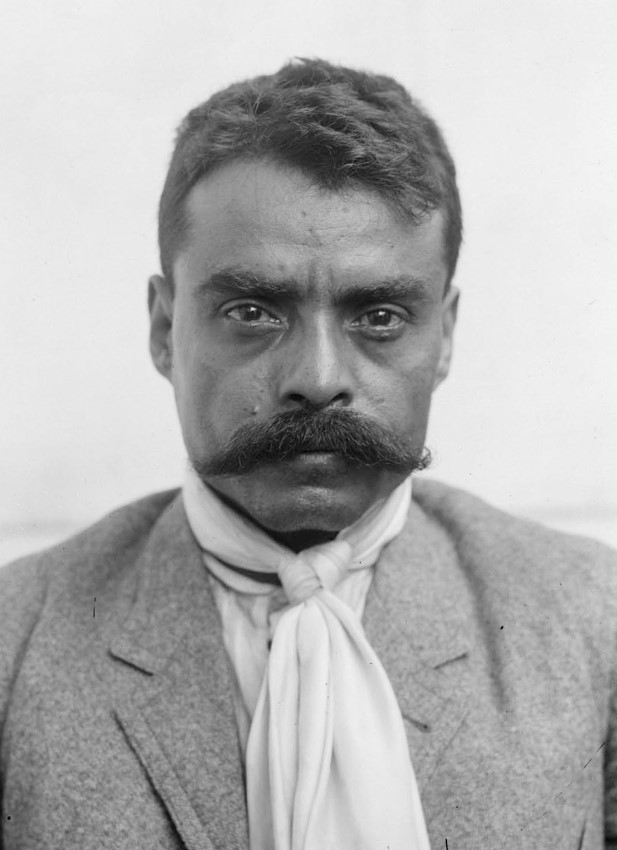
General Emiliano Zapata c 1914

In early 1912, Holmdahl was Promoted to major, and was put in charge of 1,000 irregular horsemen under the command of General Juvencio Robles. The troops entrained to Juárez, then to Mexico City, and on the long railroad passage. The expedition was against General Emiliano Zapata, who had revolted against Madero's government. The expedition assembled troops and supplies in preparation for the campaign.

Holmdahl smuggled the first in a series of letters out of Mexico to his mother in Oakland. She in turn forwarded them to the Adjutant General of the United States Army in Washington, D.C., George Andrews; they had been written on stationery hand of the Hotel St. Francis and were dated March 4, 1912. His first missive was a request for a commission as an officer in a regiment of US Volunteers, "in case you should see fit to organize troops for service in Mexico". He detailed his military record in the US army and his campaigns in Mexico; Holmdahl wrote "Speak and read Spanish, know almost every trail from boundary line down, know the way of people and all about troops way of fighting". Requesting service in a mounted unit as a scout or guide, he added "If no commission open will be only pleased to serve my country in any capacity you see fit. I am 28 years of age, single and in excellent health." Six months later, on August 23, the War Office replied. Writing to a post office in Nogales, Arizona, they informed him his letter "has been placed on file...for consideration in the event your services should be required". Zapata's faction, having considerably grown due to the influx of new rebels into its ranks, now controlled much of southern Mexico: this control, alongside Zapata's men's continued use of guerrilla, was cause of unending worries for the Madero-led central government. Holmdahl and his troop were thus sent to Torreón to fight against Zapata.

Holmdahl wrote another letter:

"I was ordered in the field against the toughest man in Mexico. General Emiliano Zapata is one of the shrewdest men in the Republic and one who does not know fear. I put in some of my hardest service that I have ever experienced in my life [in Zapata county]."

On April 21, 1912, Holmdahl wrote his second letter from Torreón. In it he stated the rumors of American intervention in Mexico were making it "dangerous for every American in this country". "I have no kick coming", he wrote, "I went into this service fully realizing what chances I was taking." Again recounting his military campaigns in Mexico and offering his services in the United States, Holmdahl warned,

"The Mexican government is enlisting a great many Japanese military men into the ranks of soldiers. I have seen in my troop and they are all graduates from military colleges... also one who served as an officer in the Japanese-Russian War. These men are far too intelligent to work for $1.50 Mex per day as a common Mexican soldier"

He wrote he would keep "a good eye" on the Japanese because "should the U.S. start to come in (to Mexico) they would have to fight them." Holmdahl reported that he expected to take part in a major battle on April 30, after which "I will march with a machine-gun detachment and 100 men to the states of Sinaloa and Tepic to reinforce the Federales. The more I kill the less the U.S. will have to take care of." In conclusion, Holmdahl wrote, "my position is very risky so destroy this letter... anytime I can be of service to my country please call—if I do not get killed." He signed it 1st Capitan Mexican Rurales. In his letter he made use of the Yellow Peril threat to enhance his standing as an important observer within the U.S. War Department.

=== Parque and Cuernavaca ===
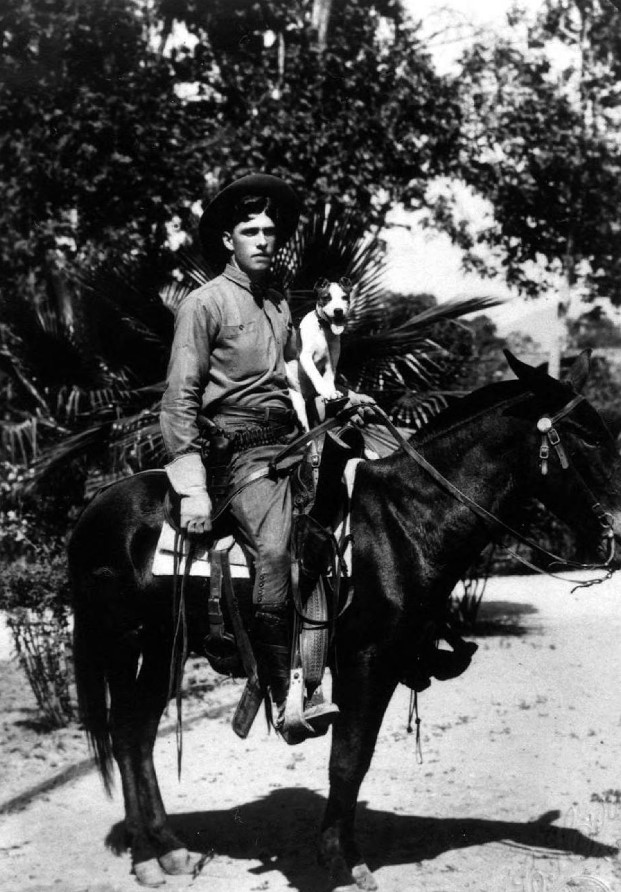
Emil Holmdahl and his pet dog during the campaign against Zapata. Later, a stray bullet hit the dog out of the saddle

In Early-mid summer, Holmdahl was ordered to Cuernavaca, the capitol of Morelos, in the heart of Zapatista country, to bring out a trainload of woman and children who were being "abused by the Zapatistas." With an escort of 27 Rurales, he reached Cuernavaca, loaded the terrified woman and children on a train, and headed for Mexico City. As the train swerved around a corner near Parque however, Holmdahl was ambushed by the Zapatistas, who were attempting to block the track. Ordering the engineer to stop, Holmdahl and his men leaped to the ground and opened deadly fire at the 300 Zapatistas who took up firing positions around the track. Holmdahl was alerted by a yell from a lieutenant and saw as the engineer panic and race full-speed through to Mexico City. The angry Zapatistas then turned their attention towards the small band of Rurales, who were abandoned to their fate. Holmdahl would later write "It seemed like certain death as we were outnumbered 11 to 1...They mounted their horses, let out a yell and made as pretty a cavalry charge as you wish to see. We met them with rapid fire from our Mauser Carbines and checked them." He wrote his Rurales were "deadly shots" and would fight to the death "as there was no quarter asked or given on either side". While the besieging Zapatistas had piles of rocks and irregular ground which gave them good cover, the Rurales on the other hand had only steel bars as cover to hide behind. Even these few inches of rail were virtuous useless as the high powered rifle bullets could penetrate the thin uptight parts of the rails. Soon the Rurales fire slackened as they took increasing casualties, while under cover of fire the Zapatistas began to move forward in short dashes until the got in hand grenade range. The Rurales were showered with homemade grenades constructed from tin cans filled with explosives. The concoction was put into a rawhide pouch filled with nails, screws, rocks, or whatever was handy, a fuse was stuck into the explosives, and the whole devil's brew was ignited by a Zapatista cigar.

Holmdahl later wrote:

"I was lying on my stomach and hugging the ground as close as I could, when a grenade landed on my arm, next to my face. I couldn't pull the fuse as it sunk into the hide. I tried to throw it, but as I was lying flat I couldn't throw it very far. Then there was an explosive. It seemed like the world would come to an end. I was blinded for a minute. There was a terrible pain in my left side."

The Zapatistas left Holmdahl no time to recover and soon mounted another charge which was barely beaten off. For several more hours the beleaguered Rurales fought back repeated attacks, but as it began to get dark, Holmdahl realized that the next attack would annulate his small band. But as luck held he heard the hooting of a whistle, and roaring down the track came a train loaded with federal cavalry under the command of Colonel Peña. They had been dispatched from Mexico City after the panic-stricken refugee train arrived and told the crews told of the Rurales abandonment. The boxcar doors swung open and Colonel Peña led around 100 mounted troops against the Zapatistas, who quickly mounted their horses and rode breakneck for safety in the surrounding mountains, while the Rurales cheered and a badly wounded Holmdahl realized he would live to fight another day.

It was morning when Holmdahl before the relief train returned the survivors of Holmdahl's small band to Mexico City. There he was taken to a hospital and finally received medical attention for his multiple wounds. He had suffered two broken ribs, both hands were badly burned, while sand and cinders had blown into his face and arms. Holmdahl wrote it was "more than three weeks before he was released from the hospital to take the field again."

By now Zapata's men controlled nearly all of southern Mexico, which made Madero desperate enough to recall the most hated man in Mexico, General Victoriano Huerta to lead a campaign against Zapata. Huerta's men crushed Zapatas men in the field and committed brutal atrocities against the civilian populous, at point ordering Holmdahl's commanding officer, General Juvencio Robles to "hang them from trees like ear rings". It was during this campaign against Zapata where Holmdahl befriended a small brown-and-white mongrel dog. During the endless dangerous patrols through rebel county, the little mutt provided a measure of company and amusement of the hard and battle hardened men under Holmdahl's command. When on the move, the dog nestled itself comfortably in the saddle between the big saddle horn and his masters lean body. Holmdahl remarked the dog could maintain its seat even during a gallop over broken terrain.

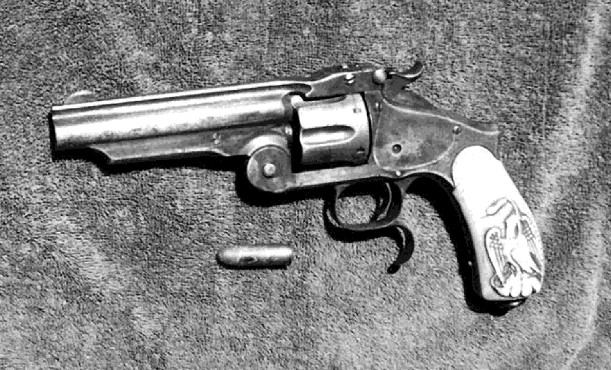
Zapata's pistol, obtained by Holmdahl. Zapata's name is scratched on the ivory handle.

One morning, Holmdahl and his troop were patrolling near a Zapata stronghold in the hills of Cuernavaca, when they surprised a small detachment of soldiers. Their massive sombreros and slung rifles identified them as Zapatistas and Holmdahl barked "Adelante Compañeros" ("Let's Go Comrades!"). His Bugler blew the charge, his men shouted their battle cries, and deploying spurred into a wild gallop. The Zapatistas turned their horses and scrambled into a head long retreat. During the running gun battle, Holmdahl's men accurately firing their 6-shooters began to empty saddles as the Zapatistas dropped dead on the ground. The Zapatistas were at an immediate disadvantage as twisting in a saddle of a racing horse to fire over your shoulder at a moving target is ineffectual at best. In their favor however, was knowledge of every trail and terrain and soon survivors began to outdistance their pursuers. In the melee however, a stray bullet found its mark and blew the stray dog off the saddle and killed him instantly.

Holmdahl identified one of the fleeing riders as Zapata himself, dressed in black charro clothes, riding a big white stallion and turning in the saddle, Zapata was firing his revolver at Holmdahl, who returned fire and almost immediately stuck Zapata in arm with his own gun and caused him to drop his pistol, and he was barely able to remain in the saddle and gallop away cursing Holmdahl. After their bugler blew recall, the exhilarated Rurales and their exhausted horses regrouped and they retraced the route of their pursuit along the trail. Along the trail, Holmdahl spotted the fallen revolver of Zapata, and he snatched it from his saddle. The pistol was a "Russian" Model Smith & Wesson .44 caliber, single action, top-break action revolver, which fired a powerful 246-grain lead slug. Holmdahl examined the gun, which contained carved ivory handles, which replaced the standard-issue grips. On one side was a raised sculpture of the Mexican eagle grasping a snake in its beak and on the side was "EMILIO [sic.] ZAPATA GENERAL EN CUARVACA [sic.] MORALES MEX MARZO 4 1911."

Shortly afterwards, the temporary federal success in the South freed Holmdahl, whose expertise in handling machine-guns and artillery were even more badly needed in the north.

=== Orozco Rebellion and artillery ===
In March 1912, a serious revolt broke out under the leadership of Pascual Orozco, who was one of the key leaders in the fighting against Diaz. Madero made the mistake of dismissing many revolutionary leaders, who now began to plot against him. Orozco soon made enemies with Pancho Villa and continued his revolt, which was initially successful as Orozco was able to capture Juárez, rout Villas, men outside Chihuahua City, and win additional victories at Santa Rosalia and Jimenez. Orozco soon made the fatal mistake of earning the ire of the U.S., who banned the selling of arms to any of the battling Mexican factions, while the battles Holmdahl and the Federals fought over were mainly over control of the strategic railroads. The Federals meanwhile had received weapons from Europe, via the ports of Tampico and Vera Cruz.

Madero was determined to crush Orozco, and dispatched a large army numbering between 6,000 and 8,000 under the command of General José González Salas. Holmdahl and his Rurales joined this force, which resulted in the First Battle of Rellano. Orozco had hired his own American mercenaries, namely Holmdahl's old Banana Wars comrades, Sam Dreben and Tracy Richardson who operated machine guns with great success against Salas's army, which ended with a cavalry charge led by Orozco. The federals suffered heavy casualties, while General Salas, overcome with grief and shame shot himself in the head. Madero soon gave command of the campaign to Huerta, a move he will later regret.

Holmdahl had been reassigned following a series of military reorganization and was ordered to report to General Jerónimo Treviño, in command of the Third Military District, headquartered in Monterrey, where he was assigned as commander of the 5th Regiment Cavalry. Holmdahl described Treviño as "One of Mexico's oldest and best generals but too old to take the field.", while he characterized Orozco as a man who had "betrayed every confidence placed in him...and was one of the biggest flour-pushers that the war produced." While serving under Treviño, Holmdahl wrote that his "Carbineros were a fine bunch of young men and were anxious to get to the front." For about a month the regiment skirmished with "Red Flaggers", Orozco's men in Northern Mexico.

In May, 1912 Holmdahl was assigned to the artillery section of Huerta's army in command of a Maxim machine-gun company. This was a welcome relief for Holmdahl as Maxim guns were far more reliable and easily transported than their older counterparts. The old American Civil War era multi-barreled Gatling Guns, a few of which were still used by insurgents, and were heavy ungainly, and could only shoot as fast as they could be cranked. They often jammed, while most other early machine guns shared the same issues. In spring and early summer, of 1912 with the new military organization and machine guns, Huerta was able to wear down Orozco's dwindling forces in a series of battles. On May 22 Huerta and Villa, alongside Holmdahl's Artillery defeated Orozco at the Second Battle of Rellano, which effectively ended the rebellion.

=== Rescue mission and minor campaigns ===
The day following Rellano, Holmdahl was summoned to Monterrey by General Treviño, who asked him to volunteer for a dangerous mission, possibly at the behest of Felix A. Sommerfeld, head of Mexican Secret Service, whom Holmdahl had joined around this time. Following the First defeat at Rellano, Madero's favorite cousin, Captain Lorenzo Aguilar had gone missing, alongside two other officers after a fight near the small village of Pedriceña. Holmdahl's mission was to travel behind enemy lines, and locate Aguilar, alive or dead, and bring him or his body back to federal controlled territory. With false papers identifying him as a correspondent for the Monterrey Daily Mexican-American newspaper, Holmdahl boarded a train bound for the headquarters of his friend, General Aureliano Blanquet, located a few miles south of Torreón. When Blanquet heard news of the mission he refused to let Holmdahl cross into enemy territory controlled by General Emilio Campa, who had recently trumped up charges against Sam Dreben and Tracy Richardson, and planned to shoot them to "rid Mexico of all gringos", forcing to pair to escape from jail.

Blanquet feared that Holmdahl would be subject to a firing squad. There was additional danger in the fact that Campa knew Holmdahl as a comrade from the campaigns against Diaz. Appreciating Blanquet's concerns Holmdahl nonetheless bought a horse and saddle, and slipped out of camp, before riding 35-miles north, and reaching Campa's Hacienda Refugio. Unfortunately for Holmdahl, he was captured by a "Red Flagger" patrol and brought before General Campa, who treated Holmdahl like an old friend, but then questioned him, asking if he was still in the service of Madero. Holmdahl denied this and showed Campa his newspaper correspondent papers, to which Campa called him a liar and a spy and announced he would shoot him. Holmdahl utilized his ability as con artist and was able to "half convince" Campa of his Bona Fides, and he treated Holmdahl with a delicious meal in his officer's mess. In the morning, however Campa refused to allow the "correspondent" to pass through his lines.

Disappointed, but lucky to be alive, Holmdahl left the camp, skirted the rebel patrols, got close to Pedriceña, and was picked up by another scouting party. Arrested he was brought before another rebel general, where he was able to talk his way out yet again, and was finally able to reach Pedriceña. There he found an old Rurale, who recounted a sad story. During the fighting on May 14, Aguilar searching for ammunition for his beleaguered men, ran into a "Red Flagger" patrol distinguished in federal uniforms. When Aguilar approached them they shouted "Viva Madero", but when he got up close they leveled their rifles and shouted "Viva Orozco" and took him prisoner. Two other officers and several dozen men were captured when they ran out of ammunition. Another Witness Señora María Peña, told Holmdahl that on May 15, about 5:30 in the morning, she heard loud voices in a field above her house. Going outside she saw 6 federal officers lined up in the field surrounded by "Red Flaggers". She said an Orozco officer told the men if they shouted "Viva Orozco", their lives would be spared, but defiantly the prisoners shouted "Viva Madero". They were promptly shot and their bodies dragged into a nearby ditch and dumped with the rest of the casualties of the battle.

Holmdahl purchased a shovel and mule, and that night he went to the mass graveyard where his witnesses said Aguilar was buried. There he started digging and by lantern light examined each body he dug up. The sixteenth corpse was the young captain. Recovering Aguilar's body, he strapped him on his mule, and then rode ninety miles through enemy lines until he go back into federal controlled territory. Having Returned Aguilar's body to Monterrey, Holmdahl, General Treviño, the mayor of the city, and other high ranking officials posed around the casket of the unfortunate captain.

On August 9, 1912, Holmdahl again wrote to the U.S. Army Adjutant General in Washington, D.C. This time the letter was mailed from the Montezuma Hotel, in the border city of Nogales, Arizona. From there he reported "things are looking worse every day down here." Again offering his services, he pointed out he had commanded 5,000 soldiers of all army branches at the beginning of the revolution:

"Am thoroughly acquainted with their country, climate conditions, water holes, mountain trails, their modes of fighting and supply stations and will gladly give you any information you wish, as I believe that am better posted than any other American as I have fought with them for two years...I am on my way to report to the general in command of the First Military Zone in Sonora." E.H. Holmdahl, Captain Primero Caballeria

For the rest of the year, Holmdahl and his machine guns would engage in mop-up duty in minor campaigns, fighting under Colonel Guillermo Rubio Navarrete in Chihuahua, his friend General Aureliano Blanquet in Durango and Zacatecas, and with General Treviño yet again in Nuevo León, Coahuila, and Tamaulipas. In Mexico 1912, machine gunning was a growing industry.

By October, Holmdahl was again restless as he gotten bored with machine guns, and longed for a cavalry command with the hardened Rurales he had led against Zapata. And thus he sent a letter to his sometimes mentor and sometimes foe, Emilio Kosterlitzky, the tough Cossack who commanded all the Rurales in northern Mexico requesting a transfer to the Rurales. Kosterlitzky responded on October 24 writing "Believe me I deeply regret not to be able to have you with me for the present, but I hope for an opportunity to notice you having a place for you. With warm personal regards..." Kosterlitzky was probably indicating that he no longer held the same free hand, he had under Diaz.

=== Secret Service and plots against Madero ===
Holmdahl continue his role in the Mexican Secret Service with absence of conflict, reentering the shadowy underworld of El Paso, which was hub for gunrunners, smugglers, war correspondents, and spies. It is unclear at would time he would join the secret service under Sommerfeld, but a mysterious note dating from November 11, 1912, reads as follows

"Mr Holmdahl, c/o Condr — No 11."
Agua Zorea
Meet me on wire when no 12 gets to Hermosillo — Opr. Nogales can
give you time.
H.J Temple."

Holmdahl responded in his exquisite hand writing years later, around 1918 "Temple was general manager So[outhern]. R[ail]R[oad] of Mexico. Shot himself when confronted by US agents making arrests for selling information to the Germans." This note proves that Holmdahl was definitely working for secret service by at least November 1912. During the same month, he reported to Lee L Hall, the successor of Powell Roberts in Sommerfeld's organization. He entered El Paso as an agent, under the disguise of a mercenary he infiltrated the Orozquistas in the town, and was instrumental in arresting at least one of Orozco's senior generals.

On December 28, Holmdahl wrote a long report which states that one Jesus Cesneros [sic], the proprietor of a barber shop in the 500 block of South El Paso Street, had a secret back room. It was used, Holmdahl said to as a headquarters for renegade "Red Flaggers" who were smuggling guns and ammunition across the border and plotting another revolt. In his report he listed the names of a half-dozen former Orozco officers. He describes how they subverted the Madero garrison in Juárez by offering the poorly paid soldiers large sums of money in return for turning over their ammunition to one of their spies. The spy, after accumulated fifty rounds of ammunition would give it to a young woman, named Simone Acosta who would smuggle it across the border under her voluminous skirts. The ammunition was stored in a secret cache under the floor of the barber shop. Then it was smuggled back across the border to the rebel army. Holmdahl had placed his own spy in their meetings and was able to give details of cattle-rustling schemes, the proceeds of which would go to support the rebels. Topics among rebels included troop movements of General Trucy Aubert, still loyal to Madero, and discussed ways the common soldiers could be persuaded to join the rebellion. The mastermind of the plot was General Inez Salazar. Holmdahl's finished report was possibly either written for General Aubert, or even the U.S. Bureau of Investigation, the forerunner of the FBI.

Holmdahl would appear as a witness for the Mexican government in this and several other Neutrality Laws trials in the fall and late winter, 1912.

A letter dating November 4, 1913, from an agent in Douglas, Arizona, office of the Bureau to an agent in El Paso responding to a request for information about Holmdahl's whereabouts. In it the letter states.

"I saw Holmdahl in Douglass about Oct. 25...He stated to me that he had been quite seriously wounded...he was thin and pale, but was wearing good clothes and appeared to be cheerful...I do not believe he was suffering for the wants of necessaries...If such had been the case I surely [sic.] would have offered him assistance. "

In several letters to the U.S. War Department, Holmdahl had given information about conditions in Mexico and offered to be a conduit for further information. He was at least intermittently acting as an agent for the U.S. government. There was no ambiguity in his reporting to both General Aubert, and the U.S. officials, since the American government supported Madero's government and considered Orozco a bandit.

=== Madero's assassination and fight against Huerta ===
Huerta had been named commander and chief of the Mexican army, and almost immediately began to plot against Madero. On February 9, 1913, the "Decena Tagica", the ten tragic days, a phony war was staged in Mexico City between conservative and federal troops under Huerta. During the intense fighting, innocent civilians were killed until the farce ended. During the time, U.S. Ambassador Henry Lane Wilson acted as a go-between for the contending forces as Wilson, opposed to Madero supported the coup led by Huerta. On the night of February 17, Huerta had Madero arrested on trumped-up charges, and on February 22 had him and his vice president, Pino Suárez assassinated, and he seized control of Mexico, although he soon received heavy opposition.

The Maderistas had no intention of letting the Huertistas savor their ill-gotten laurels. Venustiano Carranza, governor of Coahuila, refused to recognize the new Huerta regime. With the backing of Pancho Villa in Chihuahua and Álvaro Obregón, a bean planter in Sonora, Carranza went to war against "The Apostle of the Mexican Revolution". On December 24, 1913, Holmdahl writing to the adjutant general from El Paso state that he had deserted the federal garrison of Juárez, due to the Assassination of Madero. Holmdahhl escaped to Sonora where he joined the constitutional forces, and was promptly commissioned a first captain in a unit of artillery, however Holmdahl soon suspected his old friend, General Blanquet was behind Madero's murder, and so he deserted yet again and tried to return to the United States.

On that cold night in February, Holmdahl swam his horse across the Rio Grande and dismounted, but while drying himself off an American Patrol approached and Holmdahl, not wanting to be hauled in as a border jumper plunged himself into the frigid river, which was high, and a swift current carried himself down stream, washing him on the Mexican bank. His luck failed and a patrol of troops, loyal to General Inez Salazar took him prisoner. By this time, Holmdahl was well known on both sides of the border, and when he was brought before the General himself, he laughed and said Holmdahl would be shot in the morning. Holmdahl was thrown into a local prison, but luckily he managed to bribe a guard and escape in the early morning darkness.

Holmdahl gave up thoughts of leaving Mexico, possibly wanting revenge against Salazar. Holmdahl traveled to Hermosillo, Sonora where he joined the army of General Benjamin G. Hill in rebellion against Huerta. The Yaquis were rebelling again on the west coast, and on General Hill's orders he again campaigned against them. After the Yaquis had been subdued, Holmdahl wrote that he was sent to help put down Huerta loyalist in Sonora and Sinaloa. When a number of Yaqui tribesmen changed sides and became allies, he joined his old foes and returned to Chihuahua. From there he was assigned to the Francisco Villa Brigade under the command of General Juan M. Medina.

== Riding with Pancho Villa ==
=== Shootout with bandits ===
Holmdahl joined Pancho Villa and his forces shortly afterwards, and was commissioned an officer in the artillery, under the command of General Felipe Ángeles. Holmdahl's first assignment, while serving Villa was to retake a silver mine, which had been captured by Bandits. Holmdahl set out towards the mountains behind Chihuahua alone. When he arrived at the mine, the bandits fled, while 2 of them took refuge in a rock-walled corral at nearby Rancho Guerachic. Spotting them, Holmdahl drew his 6-shooter and spurred his horse. Sailing over the wall, his revolver blazing, Holmdahl and bandits blasted way at each other until the bandits dropped dead. The gun fight was at such close quarters that Holmdahl was powered burned, but was otherwise unharmed. After returning the silver mine over to Villas men, he returned to his artillery command, prepared to fight under Villas banner.

=== Charge at San Andrés and promotion to Colonel ===
Throughout the summer Villa was at the peak of his success, winning battles against Huerta's army. His infamous division of the north had a strength of almost 50,000 tough, disciplined troops, loyal only to Villa, and although Venustiano Carranza was the nominal leader of the revolt, it was Villa and his men who did most of the fighting. In short order, Villa had captured Guerrero, Bustillos, and Cras Grandes.

In August 1913, Villa stationed his army outside San Andrés, and on the 26th he attacked. After fighting all day he was unable to force his way into the city because of effective fire from the federal artillery. The next day, Holmdahl and his machine guns were brought up to the firing line, and began to firing into the enemy trenches. As darkness descended on the battlefield, Villa ordered one of his famous cavalry charges, and as Villas head of bodyguard and commander of the "Dorados", Julio Cárdenas, was otherwise preoccupied, possibly wounded in the early action it fell to Holmdahl to lead the charge. Holmdahl passed command of his artillery to a subordinate, and then rode to the head of the column to commence the charge. The bugler sounded the charge, and as the Dorados charged into the mouths of the cannons shouting "Viva Villa", Holmdahl one hand on the reins, the other on his .45 caliber revolver shouted and charged the Huertistas, while his hat was shot off by a shell fragment.

Suddenly as Holmdahl charged, he was shot in the stomach and fell off his horse to the ground. The charge was successful as the Dorados overran the Huertista position, captured the artillery, and battered the defenders into submission. Martín Luis Guzmán, a Mexican Journalist, novelist, and historian credited Holmdahl with winning the battle. Holmdahl was awarded with an honorary Legion of Honor from the Mexican government, and a special promotion to colonel at only age 29, not even a year after having been promoted to major. A contemporary pamphlet described Holmdahl's charge as heroic and bold, noting that his courage should be memorialized in marble and bronze. Holmdahl spent 6 weeks in a Villista hospitable, where doctors stitched up his stomach and he quickly recovered with his accustomed vigor. By this point, Holmdahl was 30 years old and had been wounded several times, and although he was now a battle hardened and seasoned commander, his thirst for action and adventure remained undimmed.

=== Torreón and Juárez ===
The fleeing federals abandoned almost 1,000 dead as well as losing more than fifty artillery pieces, 400 Mauser rifles, 20,000 rounds of ammunition and seven railroad trains loaded with food, medical supplies, and uniforms.

The glory of victory was soured with the brutal murders of captured troops. According to one of Villas wives, Luz Corral, Orozco sympathizers, (Orozco had been pardoned by Huerta and returned from fight Villa and Carranza) had poisoned her daughter. Villa as an outraged father, cried out for vengeance and turned the prisoners over to his faithful killer, Rodolfo Fierro, called himself a frugal executioner. Fierro lined up more than four hundred helpless prisoners in groups of three. Forcing them to hug each other back-to-front, Fierro then strode down their lines firing one shot from a high-powered pistol into each trio, fatally drilling all three bodies in a single shot. Fierro would giggle to Villa "Look how much ammunition I saved." Everyone, but Holmdahl thought it was terribly amusing.

Holmdahl would participate in the First Battle of Torreón alongside Villa, against General Eutiquio Munguía from September 27 to October 1. The battle secured the town of Torreón, and provided the Division del Norte with a large volume of arms and ammunition and enabled the formation of a substantial artillery company. Villa then used captured trains to move his force to Chihuahua City. His old enemy Pascual Orozco, now allied with Huerta was commanding the garrison there. Villa sent him a demand for surrender, and Orozco replied "Come and take us, you son—of—a—bitch." Enraged Villa launched an attack a series of cavalry attacks on the city, but was repulsed with heavy loses, while Holmdahl was wounded with a bullet in the leg. The wound was not serious as he had quickly recovered in time for Villas clever coup.

Villa left a small force to surround Chihuahua City and keep up desultory fire, Villa secretly loaded the bulk of his army on trains, abandoned the city and the hated Orozco and sped towards Juárez. At each station along the 500-mile-journey, he sent a phony message to Juárez, reporting the progress of a federal train filled with reinforcements. Then he cut the telegraph wires, while the garrison bought the ruse and on November 15 the Trojan horse pulled into the border city without opposition and captured the town. By the following day, Villa had captured the surprised 300-man garrison, and Fierro shot them all. Villa methodically looted the many banks, gambling halls, whorehouses, and saloons in the city. With a large war chest, Villa bought fresh supplies of guns and ammunition that had been smuggled across the nearby US border.

=== Battle of Tierra Blanca ===
Within the week, however, the reinforced federal garrison at Chihuahua City had broken through his thin lines and was heading up the railroad towards Juárez. Villa sent out patrols to wreck the Central Railroad line leading to the city and deployed his men in a lines centered at Tierra Blanca, twenty miles south of Juárez. There, he occupied high ground overlooking the sandy desert through which the federal army would attack. His men dug in on a low ridge of dunes on each side of the railroad tracks. The enemy force, under Huerta loyalist General Inez Salazar, collided with Villa's trooped on November 24. The battle would determine who would hold mastery over the northern terminal at Juárez. Orozco, meanwhile led 4,000 of his "Colorados" in an attempt to circle behind the rebels' left flank. Villa shifted his reserves and drove them back. Throughout the day, hundreds of terrified Mexicans in Juárez fled across the international bridge to El Paso, as the booming of artillery shook window panes in the border cities. Trains full of Villa wounded began to return from the front until the Juárez railroad station was bombed and completely destroyed.

At 5 o'clock on the morning of November 25, Villa's troops took the offensive against a federal army exhausted after two days of futile attacks. A drive from the rebels left flank did not net the elusive Orozco, but, to Holmdahl's great delight, isolated 2,000 troops under General Salazar that were pinned against the Rio Grande. Villa sent a courier to the front with a command to take General Salazar alive. Villa pledged to "take him to the main square of the city and have the pleasure of shooting him myself". Salazar was able to escape, alongside many of his men, by swimming across the river with their horses, while those on foot either swam or built rafts to float to the U.S. side. There, they were rounded up and interned by U.S Cavalry patrols.

Salazar and Orozco escaped to the east across 200 mi (320 km) of wild desert, leading a caravan of 3,000 troops accompanied by federal sympathizers, including many women and children. After a five day trek, the 35 mi (56 km) long column reached Ojinaga. After scattering the small Villista garrison, they seized the town and obtained food and precious water. They had left a trail of dead from Juárez to Ojinaga. During the battle of at Juárez, many El Pasoans, unable to sleep because of the incessant firing, spent the days and nights on their rooftops watching the fighting raging across the river. The spectacle became even more exciting when stray bullets whizzed over their heads. At the rooftop ball rooms of the Paso Del Norte Hotel, there was a carnival atmosphere. Sedate couples interrupted their foxtrots to peer over the rooftops colonnade to watch when a particular vicious shooting drowned out the music.

During the fighting, Holmdahl was interviewed by reporters from major U.S newspapers. Most credited Holmdahl with winning the battle, reporting that he "led charge after charge until the enemy was repulsed."

The San Francisco Call stated, "It fell to an American to display the most daring ability to fight under the fire of the enemy. Emil L. Holmdahl, now chief of Villa's artillery, is given the credit of the rebel victory and the holding of the Federals in check. Holmdahl is an Oakland man. While he is fighting as a soldier of fortune his white harried mother sits in her home at 617 Angar Street, Oakland, and anxiously awaits news from the Mexican border."

Another newspaper quoted Holmdahl's mother, "I fear I shall lose my boy some day...he is so impetuous and devoted to the cause of Madero that he will not be content to remain in the rear ranks."

The San Francisco paper further commented, "This American, who is a major [colonel] in the rebel forces, is the recognized strategist of the defenders of Juárez. In the morning's battle he displayed great fighting ability, and time after time led the charge against the federal positions."

Although inferior in numbers, artillery, machine guns, and ammunition, Villas wild cavalry attacks, covered by Holmdahl's guns and artillery, routed the federal attackers. Many frightened federal soldiers, some only raw recruits, were found huddling together under a white flag. Villa ordered them shot to a man. In all, the federals had more than 1,000 killed and 600 wounded, while Villa's forces suffered 200 dead and 300 wounded. During the battle, Holmdahl's Maxim guns did yeoman service in shooting federal troops. The Aftermath of the battle was a bonanza for Villa as his forces captured four trains loaded with supplies, several artillery batteries, a dozen machine guns, hundreds of rifles, and 400,000 rounds of ammunition. The Battle of Tierra Blanca "showed the strengths and weaknesses" of Villa's strategic thinking.

=== Battle of Zaragoza ===
A few days after the battle, Holmdahl led a patrol of forty mounted men through the desert southeast of Juárez, searching for a band of Huerta troops who were raiding Villa's supply lines. Based in the Texas border town of Ysleta, fifteen miles east of EL Paso, the band crossed the Rio Grande into Mexico on daring raids and then fled back to Safety in Texas.

Holmdahl was informed of the whereabouts of the raiders by a US army officer, who was an old comrade in the 20th Infantry Regiment, now stationed in El Paso. They were patrolling the area in order to protect the border cities from bandits, which would ultimately lead to the Bandit War two years later. With this information, Holmdahl was able to slip into the group's camp at dawn, near Zaragoza and, although there were at least 200 federals, Holmdahl struck hard and fast.

By positioning his men between the Federal camp and the river, Holmdahl's surprise attack cut off the enemies escape route and scattered most of the bands towards the river town of Zaragoza. Riding into town, Holmdahl was hit with a rifle bullet entering the top of his shoulder blade near the base of his neck and coming out beneath the shoulder blade. Knocked out of the saddle, Holmdahl fell into the dusty street of Zaragoza. Laying there, he watched his infuriated men shoot many of the raiders out of their saddles and capture 28 of them, while the remaining 172, unable to flee, were killed in the engagement. His men however, believing their commander dead, lined the prisoners against an adobe building and shoot them.

Holmdahl was taken to El Paso, where under the care of American doctors he recovered and returned to the front.

=== Smuggling operations and arms dealing ===
In December 1913, Villa and his army rested and reequipped in Juárez. Villa realized that he needed more guns and ammunition if he were to drive to Mexico City. To this end he organized a massive smuggling operation in which Holmdahl would be a key figure.

Holmdahl established himself at the Sheldon Hotel in El Paso, where he made contacts with U.S businessmen who, in exchange for cattle, cotton, copper, and silver appropriated by Villa, delivered guns and ammunition to the border. The guns and ammunition were disguised as "agricultural equipment" in an attempt to fool authorities. Hundreds of crates labeled as plows, harvesters, and windmills were delivered to El Paso by rail. From the freight station, they were unloaded at night into wagons hauled by mules and taken into the desert. There they were met by bands of smugglers who opened the boxes and transferred the cargo of Winchester .30-.30 carbines, Colt .45 caliber revolvers and cases of ammunition to pack mules. At night, in small caravans, they dodged the few American patrols and waded the shallow Rio Grande into Mexico.

During this time, Holmdahl while working as Villas purchasing agent was reunited with Tracy Richardson, who was into the gun running business working for Villa while Sam Dreben defected to Villa's side. The distinguished soldier and military historian, General S.L.A. Marshall, commented on the times, later wrote "Gun running was common along the border. A gun runner was regarded as an adventurer, not a criminal." Marshall wrote that Holmdahl was "Villa's agent in negotiations with the business community in El Paso.

=== Spilt loyalties and fall of Huerta ===
Holmdahl became disillusioned with Villa as he had lapse of conscience watching Fierro kill civilians, as well as perceived jealousy on the account of his superior officers, which would result in him once again becoming an informative to the U.S. government.

On December 24, 1913, Holmdahl again wrote the adjutant general in Washington D.C. stating,

"Have just resigned as 1st Capt. of Artillery, with Gen. Pancho Villa's Rebel Forces in Chihuahua, my reasons for doing such; were on account of ill feelings and petty jealousies shown me by my superior officers"

The letter also stated, "Can speak the Spanish language fluently. While campaigning through 13 (Mexican) states, I have learned the water holes, and trails." He gave a reference to Brigadier General Hugh Scott, the commanding general of U.S. forces along the border. In the letter, he added, "Before leaving Villa's forces, have taken a full list of all artillery and small arms." Although Holmdahl had officially resigned from Villa's forces, he continued to work alongside him for the time being. In supplying information to Washington, Holmdahl now working for Carranza, could be said to be spying for 3 different armies, impressive even for the Mexican Revolution.

On January 10-11th, Holmdahl took part the Battle of Ojinaga, against Huerta's commander, General Salvador Mercado, which saw the Villa emerge victorious, while Pascual Orozco fled to the U.S and was later killed. Only 35 rebels were killed, while 4 cannons, 100,000 rounds of ammunition, and 2,000 Mauser rifles were captured. Following the Battle, Villa was in full, undisputed control of Chihuahua, was the daring the American War correspondents and viewed favorably by the American government.

Between 21 March and 2 April, Holmdahl fought in the Second Battle of Torreón, alongside Villa and General Felipe Ángeles. In June, Holmdahl was ordered part from Douglas, Arizona, and to retake Lower California from Huerta's supporters, as three previous expeditions had failed.

An article in The New York Times on June 20 recorded his departure:

Douglas, Ariz, June 19 —— After the departure of Major [Colonel] E.L Holmdahl of Villas Gen. Villa's personal staff from Agua Prieta for Nogales and Hermosillo, the statement was made by Constitutionalists, that he had been delegated by Villa to equip and lead an expedition to take Lower California for the insurgents. Such an attempt would require a March across the desert in order to Capture Mexicali and Tía Juana. Three previous expeditions have failed.

Little is known about Holmdahl's campaign, but he was able to complete his objective and capturing the state for Villa and Carranza, and would leave shortly afterwards to fight in the Battle of Zacatecas, which saw Huerta resign and flee the country, and would die two years later. Carranza would become president and peace was once again restored.

The newly found peace did not last long as conflict would soon break out between Villa and Carranza.

== Service under Carranza ==
=== Organizing resistance against Villa ===
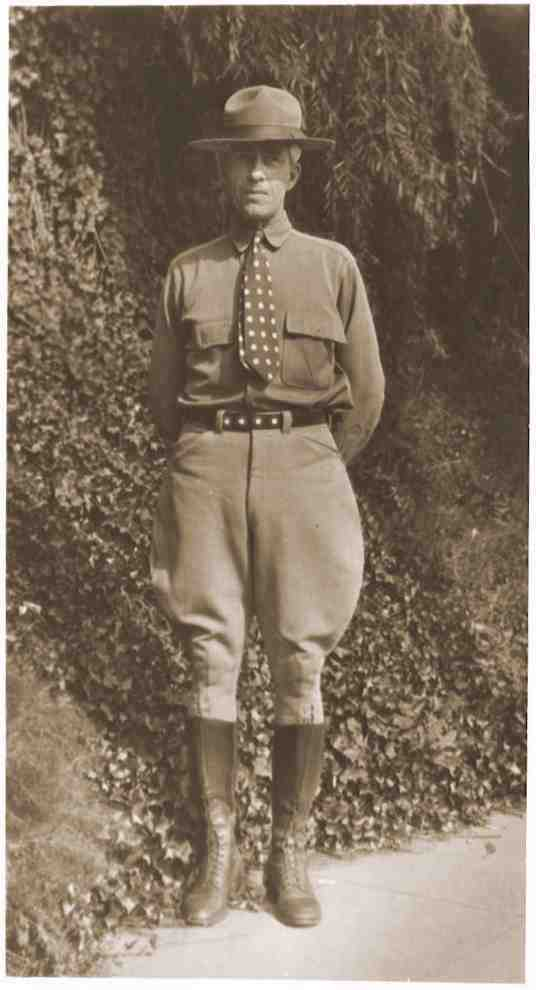
Emil Holmdahl in 1914 as an officer in the Mexican revolutionary forces

During the buildup to conflict and Villa's year of triumph, Holmdahl was secretly taking orders from General Benjamín G. Hill, Carranza's chief officer stationed along the Texas border. As the conflict broke out into open warfare, Holmdahl was commissioned by General Hill to spy out the location and strength of Villa's forces remaining in the north.

In October 1914, Holmdahl was ordered to organize a small army to operate behind Villa's lines in Chihuahua. He formed an alliance with Jorge U. Orozco, a Carranza diplomat who was formerly the Mexican Consul in El Paso. Also involved were José Orozco, a former colonel in the "Colorados" and a cousin of General Pascual Orozco, now in hiding somewhere in the United States, and Victor L. Ochoa, a Carranza agent, who had previously served three years in an American prison during the 1890s for attempting to organizing a revolution against Diaz, while in American territory. In 1911, Ochoa was involved in another plot against the dictator, he was caught, tried, and convicted in a federal court. After 18 months in jail, he was released at Carranza's request and Joined Holmdahl's junta.

Holmdahl's junta contacted former Mexican army officers living in the United States who had previously fought for Diaz, Madero, Orozco, or Huerta. It did not matter who their previous allegiance was to, as they and other volunteers, along with a boxcar loaded with military supplies, were to go by railway from El Paso, sixty-five miles to the west, and unload at the small cattle town of Columbus in New Mexico. From there they would dig up a secret arms cache in the desert that had been buried the previous year by the "Colorados". After picking up more local recruits, they planned to cross the border and rendezvous with Carranza troops in the area. The combined force would then capture the Villa garrison at Palomas, just across the border from Columbus. This action would cut Villa off from the west, while a force under General Hill would attack Juárez from the east.

Holmdahl, attempting to recruit a man named Frank Heath, stated "I am organizing an army of 20,000 men to invade Mexico and take Juárez." According to Heath's later testimony, Holmdahl said he held a commission as a colonel in Carranza's army. If the invasion succeeded, Holmdahl said it would be the death blow to Villa. Unfortunately for Holmdahl's junta, Heath was an undercover agent for the U.S. Immigration Department.

On October 15, Holmdahl received a telegram from an arms dealer in Galveston, Texas, named O.R Seagraves MGR, which stated:

We have option we believe on only stock, thirty soft point Winchester cartridges in Texas option expires tomorrow do you care make us an offer on the entire lot of seventy five thousand we understand will be no further shipments this cartridge until after first year.

O.R. Seagraves MGR

It is unclear whether Holmdahl purchased the weapons, but he probably did because the .30-30 caliber carbine was a popular weapon during the revolution.

On the night of October 31, 1914, several dozen hard faced-men were lounging about El Paso's Union Station. Victor Ochoa, the aforementioned Carranza agent casually strolled among them passing out tickets for the El Paso and South Western train en route to Columbus, New Mexico, and Douglas, Arizona. Unknown to them, other eyes were watching. As the conductor bawled, "all aboard", the silent men filled onto the train, but the train did not start. Instead burly men with guns drawn and badges pinned to their coats, shouldered their way through their the passenger cars, arresting the volunteers. The men were agents of the U.S. Bureau of Investigation and custom agents. The volunteers were herded into the railway office and questioned. Most admitted they had signed up to fight for Carranza more for his money than for his cause. Except for Ochoa, they were all released, for the American officers were after bigger game than a few penniless vaqueros hoping to join any army that would pay and feed them.

=== Conspiracy and arrest ===
Holmdahl, meanwhile was riding on a train carrying both passengers and freight, including a boxcar filled with military equipment labeled as agricultural supplies. For some reason, he received word not to unload at Columbus, but to proceed on to Douglas, where he was to unload the merchandise, rendezvous with his troops, and cross the border near Agua Prieta. As the train pulled into the Douglas deport, Bureau of Investigation officers arrested Holmdahl, routed his boxcar to a siding, and opened the crates. Inside they found 100 saddles, bridles, and horse blankets, 75 cases of .30-.40 caliber rounds, 50 cases of 7-mm carbine ammunition, 400 canteens, 160 .30-.40 caliber rifles, and nineteen boxes of other rifles. A box of buglers were also found.

Holmdahl, Ochoa, and several other plotters were taken before the federal district court in El Paso and charged with violations of the 1911 Federal Neutrality Laws, which forbade raising troops for foreign armies on U.S. soil. They were also charged with attempting to smuggle arms and ammunition across the border. Their penalty, if convicted, could be three years in a federal penitentiary and a fine of $10,000. After arraignment the men were released on bond pending a trial date.

While out on bail, Holmdahl with his usual boldness, continued his gun-running operations, as evidenced in a series of telegrams received from an arms dealer on December 12, 1914:

Major E.L Holmdahl
Can offer you salvage millimeters at thirty five per thousand under terms suggested by Brennan we have just turned down a cash offer of this amount giving Constitutionist (i.e. Carranza forces) preference can you use heavy pieces Gatling guns thirty forty Kraig [sic.] cartridges etc wire at our expense if you want us to write fully at Naco [a railroad deport on the Arizona-Sonora border] shortly will have best stock of war munitions in the south and it would be of mutual interest to keep in touch with us you ought to be able to use some of our army aeroplanes with some experienced airmen furnished by us.

Presumably responding to an answer by Holmdahl, the company replied by telegraph:

Major E.L. Holmdahl
Will only sell the millimeters subject to condition as comes from boat cannot guarantee salvage goods the market is good better wire acceptance immediately and arrange with your people for financial details as we can sell five times over these figures.
Pierce Forwarding Co. Galveston. 1:58 p.m.

Apparently the deal was settled as M. Brennan, a Holmdahl agent telegraphed:

E.L. Holmdahl
As a favor got Pierce to let us have millimeters at same price as other offer they have opportunity to receive cash today if possible accept without guarantee and have (General Benjamin) Hill wire immediately guarantee of draft of COD.
M. Brennan Galveston 2:23 p.m.

On January 10, 1915, Brennan telegraphed Holmdahl offering another deal:

Pearce Forwarding Co. Have fifteen hundred thirty rifles and carbines thirteen one hundred thousand forty five seventy Springfield cartridges forty fifteen hundred forty five seventy Springfield rifles ten.
M. Brennan

Since this rather blatant negotiating was done over open telegraph lines, the parties either knew government agents were not monitoring telegraphic traffic or they were extremely careless. In February 1915, Holmdahl was in Vera Cruz, probably illegally, since he was at this time out on bail and not allowed to leave the country.

A letter written by a Carranza brigadier general named Hernandez who on February 23, wrote to El Paso mayor, Tom Lea:

Dear Friend and Brother.
The bearer Major E.L Holmdahl, is leaving (Vera Cruz) for your city to await trial by the U.S. Federal court, accused of violating neutrality laws, the charges against him were made by Héctor Ramos, chief of Villa's Secret Service, who has personal ill feelings towards the Major who was at one time connected with Villa as the chief of Artillery, leaving them to join our cause.
The Major is a personal friend of mine, and I would greatly appreciate anything that you may do for him in receiving justice in pending trial. Wishing you every success in your new undertaking.
Very Respectfully
J.H Hernandez
Brigadier General

Interestingly, if Mayor Lea was an ally in February, he had changed sides by December and was backing the junta of Pascual Orozco, Victoriano Huerta, and Inez Salazar, all former enemies. Now allies they were planning an invasion from across the U.S. border. According to statements made from a Federal jail in El Paso by six former Huerta officers, Tom Lea was in on the plot against Carranza. The officers stated they were part of a group of 200 recruits that had rendezvoused at Lea's El Paso ranch, where they were to be issued guns and ammunition and then would be joined by Inez Salazar. Salazar had been incarcerated in a New Mexico prison, but he broke out of jail and was riding to El Paso with fifty mounted and armed men who would lead the revolt. The rendezvous at the Lea ranch was broken up when a troop of U.S. cavalry descended on the plotters. A score of volunteers were arrested, while the rest scattered and ran either into the desert and surrounding Franklin Mountains or dived into the Rio Grande and swam to Mexico.

Holmdahl, who had an informant in the "Red Flaggers" camp, probably tipped off the cavalry as to the time and location of the meeting. The six officers told U.S. officials that they made their statements because the junta failed to provide their families with funds, did not get them lawyers, and let them to rot in jail.

=== Secretive activities and trial ===
During most of 1915, Holmdahl's activities are largely shrouded in mystery. While awaiting trial, he continued working for Carranza as a spy, arms agent, and smuggler. He was not to surface again until October 1915, when he and other plotters went to jail in El Paso's Federal district court. It was a brief affair with the little grounds for defense. Former Mexican revolutionary officers testified they were recruited and paid to cross the border and invade Mexican soil. Various arms salesmen testified that Holmdahl had bought and paid for weapons. A variety of American agents, included the aforementioned Frank Heath, testified they had been approached by Holmdahl, Ochoa, and either José or Jorge Orozco to join the "filibusters"

After a short time, the jury brought in a verdict of guilty against Holmdahl, Ochoa, and José Orozco. Jorge Orozco was found not guilty. it was the first case the government successfully prosecuted recruiters and gun-runners under the Neutrality laws. Because of that, or perhaps because rumor had it many of the prominent businessmen in El Paso were involved in bankrolling the plot, Judge Thomas S. Maxely showed leniency. The three were sentenced to eighteen months in a federal penitentiary and no fine was levied. After sentencing, the three were released on $7,500 bonds pending appeal.

While out on bail, Holmdahl learned of the treachery of Tomás Urbina, and old compadre of Villa during his bandit days. After being badly beaten by Carranza forces, General Urbina had become a deserter. Abandoning his shattered forces, the old bandit took his accumulated loot, said to be worth millions in gold and silver, fled to his stronghold, Las Nieves, in Durango. Villa smelled betrayal, and took Fierro and 200 men, and rode to Urbina's strong, where upon discovering lost gold, had the former bandit killed. Fierro had been too eager, for there were rumors of other caches of treasure buried by Urbina. When Holmdahl heard news of the rumors, he filed news of them for later, where perhaps he could search for the gold himself. Fierro, meanwhile on the return to catch up with Villa had stumbled into quicksand, and the men with him refused to hand him a rope and he suffocated beneath the quicksand.

Holmdahl proceeded to fight against Villa during the Battles of Celaya, Agua Prieta, and Nogales. Holmdahl also took part in the ongoing Bandit War against Seditionistas.

A little more than a month after his conviction, Holmdahl applied for a commission as an officer in the United States cavalry. On December 29, 1915, he filled out a three-page government form addressed to the adjutant general of the U.S. army. On the application he stated he held the rank of colonel of cavalry with Carranza forces and was formerly chief of Artillery under Villa. To endorse his application, he gave a list of references, including Tom Lea, mayor of El Paso; Lee Hall, the chief of police of El Paso and a former Texas ranger; a banker from Morenci, Arizona; a captain in the U.S. army stationed at Fort Bliss; and General Hugh Scott, chief of staff and commanding officer of the U.S. army. He gave his address as a post office box in El Paso. On March 28, 1916, the war department answered Holmdahl's application by stating he failed to qualify for appointment as an officer of volunteers because of regulations stating "no applicant is eligible for appointment as second lieutenant who is more than 30 years of age." Holmdahl was thirty-two years old and if the war department knew he was a convicted felon, it was not stated.

Fate, however, intervened when Holmdahl's old boss, Pancho Villa, galloped into Columbus, New Mexico, on March 9 with a band of 400 men, shot up an army encampment, burned the town, and killed sixteen Americans.

== Pancho Villa expedition ==
=== Civilian scout and missing documents ===
The US quickly responded, appointing Brigadier General John J. Pershing to lead an army into Mexico to either kill or capture Villa. Pershing recognized he needed men who knew Mexico, its terrain, language, culture, and its people. Holmdahl was clearly such a man Pershing needed, and thus the convicted felon was recruited to serve as a civilian scout for the US army.

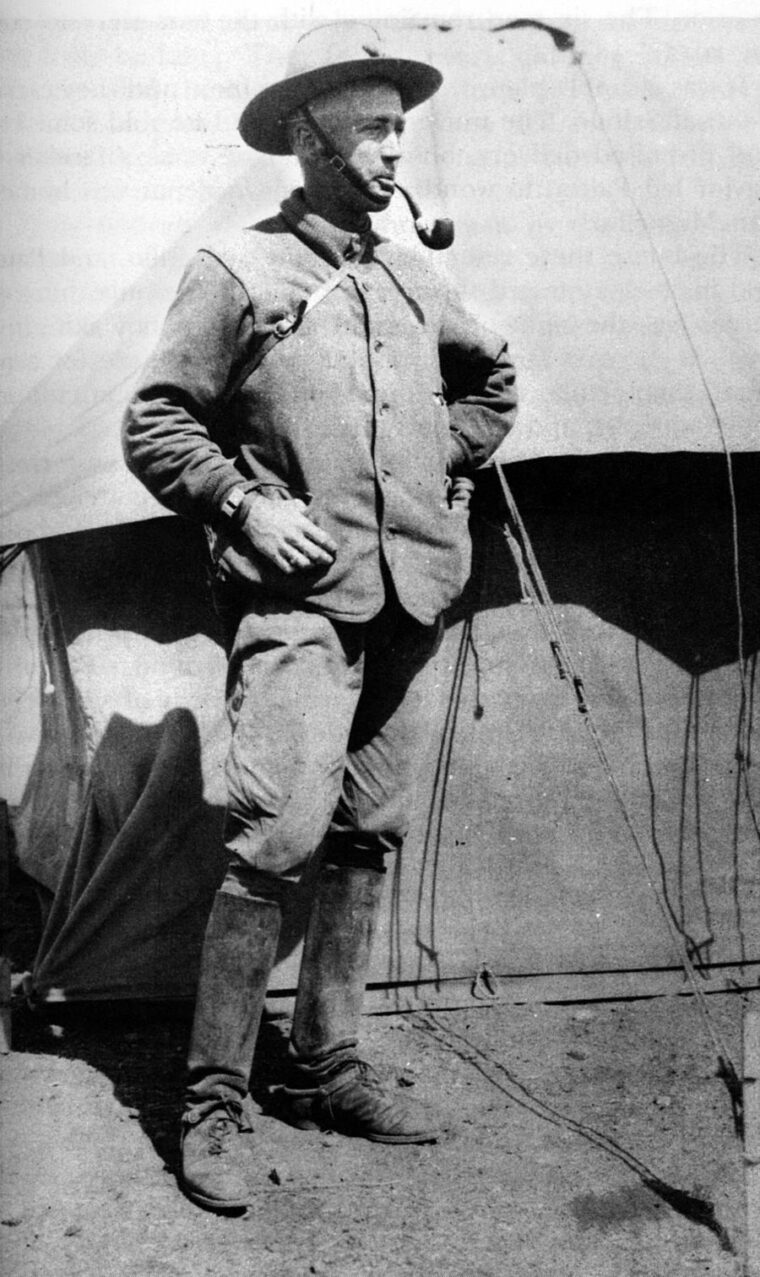
Lieutenant George Patton on duty in northern Mexico, May 1916

For the first two months, Holmdahl's activities are not known, as most of his records were destroyed, possibly by Pershing himself in the 1920s, then serving as Chief of Staff of the US Army. The purging of such documents appears to be the most likely, as Pershing would have sought to eliminate documents detailing his secretive actions surrounding assassination plots and spy work.

=== Rubio ranch and George Patton ===
In May 1916, Holmdahl became involved with a young Second Lieutenant George S. Patton, the future commanding General of the US 3rd army during the Second World War. Patton was an aide to General Pershing himself, and was extremely eager to get into the fighting.

Pershing had established his headquarters near Rubio more than 200 miles deep in Chihuahua. Feeding his army in the barren countryside proved far more troublesome than fighting skirmishes with stray Villistas. Considering Chihuahua could barely feed its own population, it could much less provide food for the Americans.

When Intelligence sources reported that corn could be purchased at nearby Rubio and Coyote, Pershing dispatched his aide Patton, to take a small party of three automobiles and ten soldiers on a corn-buying expedition. On May 14, in three big Dodge touring cars, the group consisted of Patton, two civilian drivers, ten infantry-men armed with the famed Springfield Model 1903 rifles, and two civilians scouts. Holmdahl by this points was clearly a legend among the war correspondents, mercenary soldiers, and prominent figures on both sides of the border, and was widely known.

The group drove twenty miles down the road to Coyote. There, Patton bought a few bushels of corn. Next they drove a few miles further to Rubio. Entering the town before noon, Holmdahl spotted a number of men loitering around a plaza. Although they were unarmed, he recognized them as Villistas he fought with in campaigns against Huerta. "They are Villa's men," he whispered, "and they are a bad lot." As the men sighted Holmdahl, they drifted away down the crooked side streets of the town. This alarmed Patton, as Colonel Julio Cárdenas, former leader of Villa's elite troop of "Dolados," was rumored to be in the area.

12 days earlier, on May 2, he had accompanied "H" Troop of the 11th Cavalry on a swift approach to the San Miguelitio Ranch, eight miles north of Rubio. There, the wife and mother of Cárdenas were living in a large hacienda. At the time, the troop deployed around the hacienda and swooped down, only to find it deserted, although Patton studied the buildings and terrain, just in case he would have to return. This would prove to be an astute decision.

The group drove a few miles north of Rubio, and Patton called a halt and briefed his band of 15 men. The hacienda was built in two L-shaped wings, with a walled courtyard encompassing the entire structure. There was a horse corral a few dozen yards beyond the main gate. Windows in the wall faced out, but there was one gate from which a horseman could ride out and escape. The hacienda was 200 yards east of the road that Patton followed from Rubio, and on the opposite the road was from the main gate. If the Villistas attempted to escape, they would have to gallop out of the gate, cross the road, and ride to the mountains to the west.

Pattons plan was for the first vehicle, which he rode, to drive past the hacienda and then make a quick stop. Patton and two men would leap out of the vehicle and run to the northern end of the structure. Holmdahl and the driver would remain in the car and cover the north side of the walled area near the corral. The second and third cars were to stop on the road south of the complex. Three men from each of those cars would dismount and dash to the southern end of the building. They would intercept anyone trying to leap from the windows. The two men remaining in each of the cars would be able to stop others running from the building, and if necessary and terrain permitting, to drive in pursuit of any fleeing bandits.

As the three cars drove up to the ranch buildings, they spotted three elderly men and a young boy skinning a cow in the front yard. The boy eyed the vehicles, turned, and ran through the front gateway waving his arms and yelling. Seconds later, he returned and calmly went back to helping skin the cow.

Patton said he "jumped out [of the vehicle], rifle in my left hand" and ran to the northern end of the hacienda, while men from the other cars rushed to the southern end of the complex. He later wrote, "When I was 15 yards from the gate three armed men dashed out on horseback... I drew my pistol and waited to see if they were Carranzistas." Patton yelled "Halt." Hearing this yell, the riders wheeled their horses and galloped directly at Patton and his men. Patton later recounted that when the horsemen were about 20 yards away, "All three shot at me, one bullet threw gravel on me. I fired back with my new pistol, five times." Two of the bullets found their mark, one hitting the first rider in the arm and another rupturing the belly of another horse.

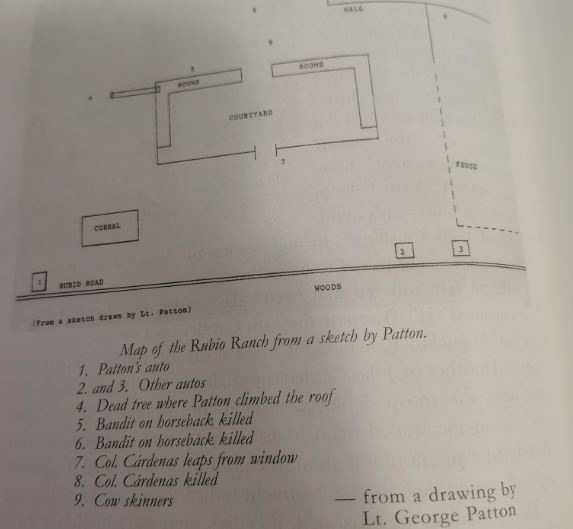
Sketch of Rubio Ranch by George Patton

At the sound of gunfire, Holmdahl on the other side of the building came on the run, shooting rapidly. To get out of the line of friendly fire, Patton leaped around the corner of the complex, as three Villista bullets, possibly fired from one of the windows, smacked the wall by his head and showered him in adobe dust. As the Lieutenant caught his breath and reloaded his pistol, he spied Holmdahl and of the drivers sprinting towards him. Patton swung back around the corner of the wall and started to shoot at the horse of the escaping man. Patton's bullets "broke the horse's hips and he fell on his rider." "Impelled by misplaced notions of chivalry," Patton wrote, "I did not fire on the Mexican who was down until he disentangled himself and rose to fire." Holmdahl had no such inhibitions, and as the man staggered to his feet, the scout shot him from 10 feet away, killing him.

The Mexican whose horse had been gutted by Patton's first shot was now up and running. Patton recalled, "I saw the man about 100 yards off, I shot three times at him with my rifle, four or five others fired also and he went down." Meanwhile, the man who Patton had shot in the arm, wheeled his horse back into the courtyard. Easing himself out of the saddle, dripping blood from his arm, he ran into the ranch house, and dashed to the back windows. Pulling himself through the window, he dropped to the ground, and fired with his pistol. He ran along a fence at right angles towards the road. He was 300 yards away when Patton spotted him and yelled to one of his troopers.

The soldier calmly wrapped the sling of his Springfield about his arm, took a bead on the running man, and fired. The trooper shook his head and cursed as the first bullet missed. Aiming again, he fired and the man dropped. Turning to Patton, the trooper held up a finger and smiled. Patton later remembered, "It was remarkable how cool the men were during the fight."

The wounded man, lying face down, lifted his head and with an effort raised his left hand in a gesture of surrender. But as Holmdahl strode towards him, the man's face twisted into a grimace of hate, as he recognized the former Villista officer. With a final effort, he raised his pistol and fired. Holmdahl, his sardonic grin never changing as the bullet sped past his ear, drew his pistol and coldly shot Colonel Julio Cárdenas through the head, killing him. The Pancho Villa Expedition ended on February 7, 1917, and Holmdahl returned to the US. William Walker, one of the civilian drivers, would later claim that Holmdahl was an adventurer who "killed for pleasure."

Patton made a quick survey of the scene. Believing Cárdenas might have as many as 30 men with him, he realized his troops were in a vulnerable position, he ordered two of his troopers to prop a dead tree trunk against the building. Patton climbed up the tree trunk and onto the roof. As he did so, the roof collapsed under him, and he drooped through the ceiling to his arm pits. Wiggling free, he perched onto the shaky roof, he scanned the courtyard, and satisfied there were no more Villistas, he climbed down, as his men gathered around, and begun a room-to-room search of the ranch house and its out buildings.

Patton ordered the three elderly men and the boy, who throughout the fighting had ignored stray bullets whizzing by them, brought to him. He used them as a movable shield as the Americans searched the hacienda. In one room they found the now widow of Cárdenas, and his infant child, and mother. In another room, they found two old woman whimpering in the corner. A final search brought up a saber and silver mounted saber, confiscated by Patton as trophies of war. The troopers collected the weapons of the three dead Villista and stowed them in the vehicles. Then they hoisted the bodies, one to a car, and tied them down.

Suddenly, Holmdahl gave a shout and pointed to a group of approximately 40 horsemen heading their way at a gallop. Patton ordered his Dodge caravan to drive off at full speed. After a few miles, when his pursuers were lost from sight, they halted. Patton ordered the telegraph lines cut to prevent an ambush.

Arriving back at Pershing's headquarters at 4 o'clock that afternoon. The two other dead Villista were identified as Captain Isadore Lopez, a Villista veteran, and private Juan Garza. National newspapers would make the lieutenant a national hero, and he was given the nickname "Bandito" by Pershing himself, while an old cavalry colonel "Old Pants" Johnson would remark "Look at the dirty bastards; look at the blood and guts on those dirty bastards." Thus, the legend "Blood and Guts" was born. Ironically, Patton, one of the last of the romantic cavaliers charging on horseback with swords drawn, led one of the first American actions where cavalry dismounted from automobiles and fought on foot with rifle and pistol.

=== Plot to kill Villa and end of fighting ===
Holmdahl, meanwhile, was still out on bail was seeking a pardon for his federal conviction.

Meed believes Holmdahl most likely solicited the following letter from Patton

Headquarters United States Troops
Somewhere in Mexico
May 20th, 1916
To Whom it may concern;
This is to certify that Mr. E.L Holmdahl, was the Government Scout with the U.S. Troops under my command in an engagement with Villa Bandits, at San Miguel Ranch, Chihuahua, Mexico, on May 14th. I have highly recommended Scout Holmdahl, for his coolness, courage, and efficiency while under fire, he personally killed General Julio Cárdenas, and Colonel Gildardo Lopez, in a pistol duel. At that time Holmdahl fought in the open, without cover of any kind and shot with great accuracy and deliberation his actions being that of a man at target practice.
I also wish to recommend him to any brother officer, who may wish a man who is thoroughly familiar with Mexico and its people or in any position of trust, as he is most reliable, and a good soldier.
(Sgd) Geo. Patton
1st Lieut 10th, U.S. Cavarly
A.D.C. General Pershing.

In a 1962 interview with historian Bill McGaw, Holmdahl said that sometime in 1917, he was ordered to report to the office of General George Bell Jr., commanding officer at Fort Bliss in El Paso. According to Holmdahl, General Pershing and one of his officers, Colonel Herbert Slocum, commander of the 13th Cavalry Regiment, gave him three $20 gold pieces for expenses to travel to El Paso.

At Fort Bliss, Colonel Slocum met with him in General Bell's office and offered him $100,000 to go back into Mexico and kill Villa. Slocum stated that payment would not be from government funds. The money would be paid for by Joseph J. Slocum, Slocum's millionaire father. Holmdahl said he turned down the offer for three reasons. First, he said, "I liked Villa personally, even though I fought against him." Second, he said, "I am not an assassin." Third, he admitted, "If I killed Villa, I never would have gotten out of Mexico alive." Douglas Meed believes the third option to be the most credible.

On July 10, Holmdahl was off again on another scouting expedition for Pershing, as attested by the following pass:

Commander of the Guard
Camp of Colonia Dublán
Please allow scout Holmdahl to pass the lines on Govt. business this date. July 10, 1916.
Respt.
W.W. Reed
Capt. 6th Cavalry
Asst Chief Staff'

Meed speculates that Holmdahl was probably on a mission seeking Villa's whereabouts, and may have succeeded. Two weeks later, Holmdahl was back at Pershing's headquarters at Colonia Dublán where he was discharged. This coincides with Holmdahl's claim to historian Bill McGaw.

His orders read as follows:

Headquarters Punitive Expedition, U.S. Army.
In the field, Mexico, July 24th, 1916.
From: The C.O. Hdqrs. Det. Punitive Expedition, Dublán Mex.
To: The Quartermaster at the Base, Columbus N.M.
Subject: Guide Holmdahl
1. Guide E.L Holmdahl has been discharged and will leave for the border on the first transportation. Please pay him for his service from July 1st, 1916 to date of his arrival at Columbus, N.M., Rate of pay One Hundred and Fifty Dollars, ($150.00) per month. He is entitled to transportation to El Paso, Texas.
M.C. Shallenberger
1st. Lieut., 16th Inf., ADC
In charge of guides and scouts.

Shallenberger was also the officer in charge of the expedition's intelligence operations.

Meed writes "Whether Holmdahl was discharged in anticipation that he would accept the assassination offer," Meed concludes "...is not known." Pershing by this point was frustrated by the limitations put on his commands by D.C. Carranza meanwhile demanded the expedition be withdrawn following the Battle of Parral.

Pershing wanted Villa badly, and he may have been angered by Holmdahl's refusal, and very well might have refused to accept Holmdahl's reenlistment as a scout.

Holmdahl disappears from view during the next four months, but in December while in El Paso, he received a curious telegram from General Frederick Funston, the commanding officer of the Southern Department of the U.S. Army, based in San Antonio, Texas:

Received at 107 North Oregon Street, El Paso, Texas
E.L Holmdahl
Your Telegram twenty sixth offering your services is at hand. Your name has been given to intelligence officer who is keeping track of all persons like yourself who might be of great assistance in case of a general movement into Mexico Thanks for your offer.
Frederick Funston
Major General

The general probably saw a kindred soul in Holmdahl, who received the following telegram.

Dec 26 1916
To. Scout Holmdahl
Hdqts 606 Brigade
You are ordered to scout out around the Mesquite and report best location for next meeting of the staff. Should you encounter any enemy shoot on sight.
By order of Cmdg General Flynn
Adj. GW [last name undecipherable]

By this time, The United States and Mexico were very close to war, as Carranza increased his demand for the immediate withdrawal of the punitive expedition.

As Pershing's cavalry pushed deeper into Mexico, Villa and most of his forces scattered and retreated to southern Chihuahua, becoming reduced to a regional menace, his ability to seize power in Mexico City was broken. In his later years, Villa would become more of a nuisance than a threat.

Many consider Pershing's expedition a failure because he did not kill or capture Villa. Pershing did however drive back Villa and his men far from the American border, successfully protecting American towns and properties from further attacks, which was the main strategic purpose of the expedition to begin with, furthermore allowing Carranza to consolidate power in Mexico.

In preparation for war against Germany, President Woodrow Wilson ordered the expedition to return to the U.S. In January 1917, the expedition began to pull back across the border. By February 1, all American troops had been withdrawn from Mexico. On April 6, the U.S. declared war on Germany. On May 10, Pershing was informed he would command all American troops who would be sent to France by General Hugh L. Scott, the Chief of Staff of the United States Army.

Meanwhile, Holmdahl was eager to get into the Great War. But as a convicted felon no longer working for the army, he was in danger of having his bail cancelled and being forced to serve out his sentence in federal prison. Using all the influence he had built up over the years, he increased his campaign to get a presidential pardon.

== World War I ==
=== Presidential pardon ===
In February 1917, Holmdahl began an immense letter writing campaign to secure a pardon by President Woodrow Wilson.

One of Holmdahl's first letters was addressed to the attorney general of the US, Thomas Watt Gregory explaining and justifying his actions. Meed describes the letter as an "ingenious document, but not quite in conformity with the trial evidence." Holmdahl in the letter gives evidence he acted as an intelligence agent on behalf of the Department of Justice. Meed speculates this is perhaps why they treated him so leniently in the coming months.

Washington DC
February 1, 1917
The Honorable
The Attorney General
Washington.
Sir:
In reference to my application for pardon, following my conviction in the United States District Court for the Western District of Texas, on the charge of having engaged in a conspiracy to violate the neutrality laws of the United States, I beg to respectfully state that at the time of the alleged offence was committed, I entertained no thought whatsoever of violating said laws or any statue of the United States. The facts in my case are as follows:
I was employed by General Benjamin Hill, commanding the Carranza forces in Chihuahua and Sonora, to gather confidential information for him along the border, the latter part of 1914. At that time, General Hill indicated to me his desire that I should come over to Chihuahua and take charge of certain of his troops, with a view of attacking Juárez. Nothing was said by him to me that these troops were recruited in the United States, and I naturally assumed that they would be a part of his own command. Meanwhile, the Carranza consul in El Paso informed me that he had purchased a carload of ammunition and equipment, and there being no embargo he was to dispatch the car to Douglas, Arizonia, for the delivery of its contents across the border. After the car had left, the consul received information that the Villistas had planned to steal the car at Mimbrios twelve miles from Columbus, and the consul sent me there in an automobile to ascertain whether the theft had been accomplished. I did not find the car and learned that the American troops had escorted the car through Douglas, where it was delivered to the Carranzista authorities at Agua Prieta. Prior to this incident, I met a Colonel Valle, of General Hill's staff, at El Paso, who desired to send some code telegrams relating to this matter to the Carranza representative in Douglas, viz: Francisco S. Elias, but the telegraph office had refused to accept them because Valle desired to dispatch them collect. He inquired of me if I could send them for him, which I did. I did not know the contents of these messages, nor do I know them yet. It appeared from the testimony given in my case that the Mexican consul, Jorge Orozco, and Victor L. Ochoa and Jose Orozco, all of El Paso, had engaged the services of some Mexicans to cross the border and join General Hill's forces. The testimony showed that I had no connection with these men and never saw any of them. This corroborated by the testimony of the two Orozcos's and Ochoa, and there was really nothing connecting me directly with the enterprise. There was no testimony adduced showing any real guilt on my part or showing that I had really conspired with any one to violate the law.
Indeed, there was no proof that I intended to accept General Hill's invitation to join him in Chiahuahua, and I am sure that a mere cursory review of the evidence will substantiate my assertion.
I have never concealed anything from the United States authorities on the border; have always been frank in dealing with them, and have, as a matter of fact, from time to time given them information of the most valuable character, as will be borne out by General George Bell, U.S.A.; Major General Pershing, U.S.A; District Attorney Crawford, and Special Agent Stone of the Department of Justice. I beg that the foregoing may be taken into full consideration in determining my application of Executive clemency.
Respectfully
(Sgd.) E.L., Holmdahl

To better press his case, Holmdahl temporarily moved to Washington D.C. While an obliging Justice Department continued to extend his bail and allow him to travel. On February 17, Colonel James A. Ryan wrote "I....am always ready to testify to your good service with me and the expedition in Mexico....Keep in touch with me as I may need you if this matter breaks out either in Mexico or Cuba." On February 22, Holmdahl replied, "When war, or intervention short of war, comes either in Mexico or Cuba, or elsewhere, I certainly hope to be among those to follow you"

Earlier, Holmdahl had asked Jeff McLemore, a member of the U.S. House of Representatives from Texas, to intercede for him and on March 19, the Congressman sent him copies of two letters written by his old boss, General Pershing.

Headquarters.
Southern Department
Fort Sam Houston, Texas
March 11, 1917
Honorable Jeff McLemore
U.S. Representative
Washington D.C.
My Dear Mr McLemore:
With reference to your letter of February 14th, setting forth the case of E.L. Holmdahl, I have fully investigated the case and am now prepared to change my opinion.
It appears from the reports of the investigation which I instituted that Holmdahl, was "more sinned against than sinning", and insofar as his conduct on that occasion is concerned, I am now willing to make recommendation for clemency.
This has no reference, of course, to his services as a scout during the Punitive Expedition. While he did some good work there, he did other things which were disapproved by me.
Sincerely Yours,
(Sgd) Major General John. J Pershing
U.S. Army Commanding

And then Pershing wrote to attorney general T.W. Gregory.

I desire to recommend executive clemency in the case of E.L. Holmdahl, charged with violation of the neutrality laws on the Mexican border and sentenced to eighteen months imprisonment. An inquiry into the facts of this case leads me to believe that Holmdahl should not be held to more than a technical violation of the neutrality laws.
Moreover, as a scout with the Punitive Expedition into Mexico, he performed service which should entitle him to the Government's consideration. I trust that you will give this request such consideration as you may deen advisable.

Pershing did not elaborate on the comment on his comment "he did other things which was disapproved by me." The most likely being, was he refusal to accept the assignment to assassinate Villa.

General Hugh Scott, who had previously signed one of Holmdahl's fitness reports in the Philippines and was clearly aware of his reporting to the U.S. government, interceded for him.

On March 16, Holmdahl wrote to the U.S. Attorney in El Paso asking for a sixty-day "respite" before reporting to Leavenworth Federal Prison. The respite was granted. In the meantime, the U.S. declared war on Germany and Austria-Hungary on April 6.

On April 21, Mayor Tom Lea of El Paso wrote to attorney general T.W. Gregory requesting executive and a pardon for his old friend. "although he is a soldier of fortune," Lea wrote, "his reputation is most excellent." The mayor added,

Holmdahl has been of very great help and benefit to the Police Department in many ways. He asked me to speak especially with reference to his arrest in El Paso some year and a half ago, in which he was accused of a misdemeanor... I know that Mr. Holmdahl acted properly on that occasion, and resented an insult from an anti-American. He was released without bond and acquitted on proper bail.

There was a note of desperation in a letter Holmdahl sent to Frank Polk of the U.S. Department of State on April 30. He wrote:

... my application for executive clemency... only awaits your recommendation.
I have now exhausted both my savings and my credit, and am two thousand miles from home, without any means whatsoever... begging your kind and early consideration.

Funds exhausted, Holmdahl returned to El Paso, where he began to blossom out as a raconteur of border adventures, as he became a local celebrity. Joe Goodell, the owner of El Paso's Sheldon Hotel, described Holmdahl as, "Sporting a black diamond ring on his finger, [he] wore flamboyant clothes and attracted attention wherever he went." Goodell provided Holmdahl with a free room, "Simply in repayment for his drawing power and influence over prospective patrons."

As the American Expeditionary Force began to mobilize for overseas duty in France, another old soldier and friend of Holmdahl's from the border days, Major Sam Robertson, commanding officer of the Sixth Reserve Regiment of U.S. Engineers, Telegraphed Congressman McLemore:

Won't you see the Attorney General and endeavor to get Holmdahl pardoned at once. Regiment needs his services badly and he will be more valuable to his country in France than in prison.

Robertson sent an identical telegram to Frank Polk at the State Department. It took another month, but on July 13, 1917, Holmdahl now back in Washington D.C., was granted a full and unconditional pardon by president Wilson.

=== Western Front ===
Holmdahl, immediately following his pardon, went to the Washington Barracks and enlisted as a private soldier in the 6th Engineer Regiment. When he took the physical, however, he was disappointed. The army medical corps physician, Lt. H.L, Taylor, found Holmdahl unfit for service by reason of pain and limited flexibility in his right knee. This was due to shrapnel wounds received in 1910. In a later army physical, Holmdahl was reported to have suffered wounds in 1911-1912-13-15-18. They included, "so far as known', shrapnel in right knee two, right shoulder, bullet two in breast, and stomach."

Adjutant General, G.W. Reed fired back a message to the medical officer, stating "Enlist that man if he has only one leg." General Reed followed up with a memo to the War Department Adjutant General Files: "The Secretary of War authorizes the enlistment of Emil L. Holmdahl, for the 6th Regiment, Engineers, National Army, waiving the defects reported." After Nineteen years, Holmdahl was again a private in the United States Army.

On July 21, Holmdahl wrote to Senator Morris Sheppard, who had helped secure his pardon, stating "I will do my very best in the Army to vindicate [your] confidence... And at the very least I can do is to sacrifice my life for a worthy cause" That same day, he wrote a letter in a more personal manner to representative Jeff McLemore, who, he said, had been "a soldier of fortune yourself," thanking him for his help.

Holmdahl wrote,

I shall never forget, and at any time that I can be of service to you or any of your friends, I will fight to the last ditch... Now that I am into it I shall try to live down the reputation given me on the border, or live up to it and fight harder than ever.

Always friendly with Department of Justice officials, Holmdahl wrote to James A. Finch, an attorney involved with his pardon application, and received back a semi-humorous reply stating, "By the way, you are the only so far who has ever gotten away with the stunt you did. Please remember you have the good wishes of all of us..."

Holmdahl reported to the 6th Engineers, later designated as the 16th Engineer Regiment (Railway). Several days after his enlistment he was promoted to first sergeant. Two weeks later, he with his regiment, were on a troop ship headed to France. Within weeks of arriving in Europe, Holmdahl was made into commissioned officer, being promoted to second lieutenant. and then quickly to first lieutenant.

Even before combat units of the U.S. army went into action, Holmdahl and his engineers were fighting as infantry alongside the British.

More U.S. engineering units began arriving in early August. They were the first U.S. troops to be sent to the front in response to the urgent requests from the British, who desperately needed trained railway personnel to construct tracks and aid in loading British tanks in preparation for a fall offensive. Holmdahl and his engineer unit were immediately assigned to the tank corps.

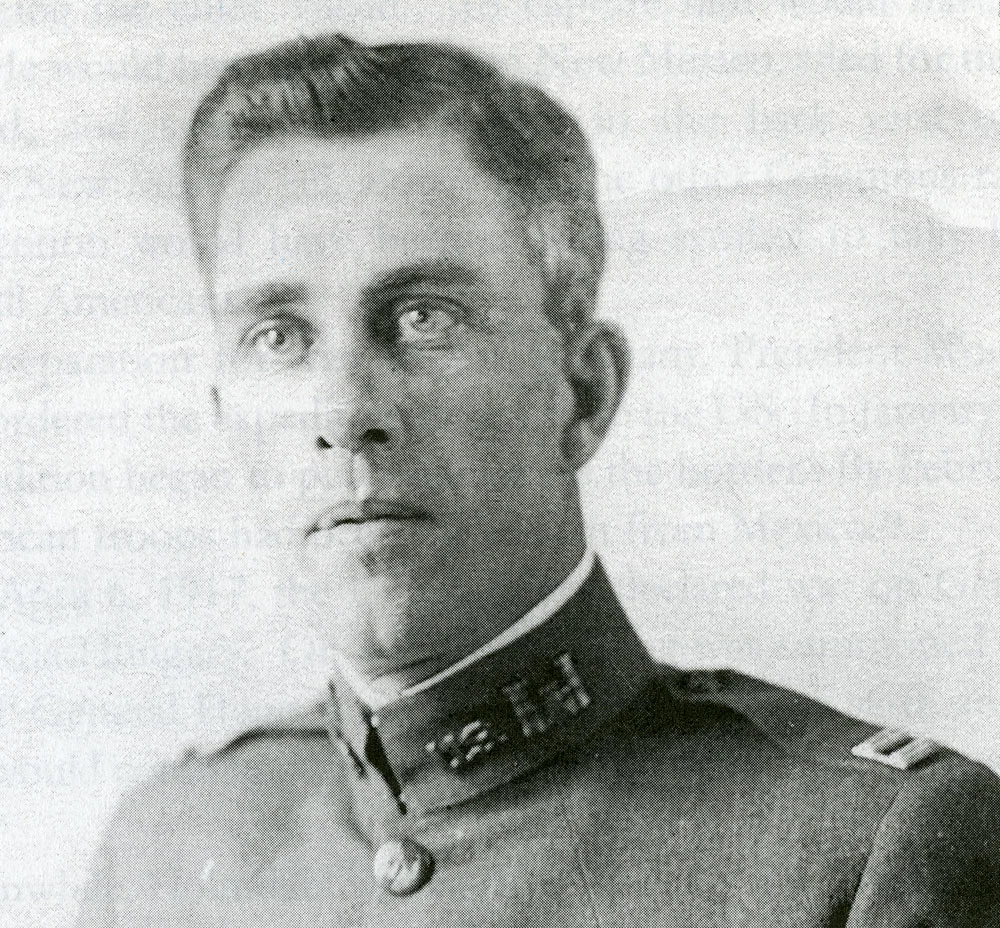
Captain E.L Holmdahl in 1918 during World War I

To give the tanks any fighting range at all, they had to transported by rail close to the front lines. Thus, the need for engineers to construct roadways and lay train tracks. by Mid-August elements of three railway engineer regiments, including lieutenant Holmdahl, were busy building standard-gauge and light-railway lines for the British military.

The British made a breech in the Hindenburg Line four miles wide, captured 10,000 prisoners, 200 pieces of artillery, and penetrated five miles deep into German defenses. On November 30, the Germans launched a counterattack and recaptured all the ground lost, driving three miles deep into the British front. Holmdahl, and the American engineers fought as infantry, alongside the British. Under heavy shell fire, they suffered as many casualties, until their British allies finally stablished a defensive line.

The American engineers continued repair and maintenance work on the British railway system, until in the early spring of 1918. On March 21, the Germans launched an attacked against the allied lines, and the British fell back exhausted. Holmdahl and his regiment were quartered in the town of Doingt, where they came under severe artillery fire. The regiment received orders to retreat to Chaulnes, the site of a major supply dump. When they reached the site on the morning on the 23rd, they were ordered destroy all supplies stored there, as the German advance was about to overrun them. Blowing up everything but their backpacks and the trucks to transport them, the engineers began a long retreat, until on the 27th, they reached a wooded area named Bois de Taillaux.

The engineers dug trenches alongside British infantry units under the command of Brigadier General Sandeman Carey. The engineers prepared for a "last stand" as the German army came close to breaking the entire allied line.

Some of the men were armed with rifles; others only had pistols. Fortunately, there was a British machine-gun school several miles behind the lines, although few of the men knew how to use them. Holmdahl, with more than a decade of using rapid-fire weapons in combat, he quickly became an instructor for both British and American troops.

As the German attacks began to lessen, Holmdahl's unit was assigned to work with an Australian corps rebuilding bridges until June 10, 1918, where they were assigned as divisional engineers for the Third Infantry Division.

On July 14, while Holmdahl's Company F was constructing defense works on the Third Division front near Chateau Thierry, the Americans suffered a heavy artillery bombardment, followed by a strong German attack on the morning of the 15th. The attack was beaten off, and a week later the Americans were ready to advance. Holmdahl's company, in preparation for the assault on July 21, constructed two footbridges across the Marne River. The following day, after the Americans had attacked and advanced, Holmdahl and his men spanned the river with a pontoon bridge built from captured German equipment.

On July 30, Holmdahl was promoted to Captain.

After the bridges were built and the American advance continued, the engineers were "'engaged as infantry support'" They continued fighting until on August 10, when they were relieved and moved to a rear area where they rested and refitted

Holmdahl was assigned to the Engineer School at Longre, France to train newly arrived American troops. On November 23, after the Armistice ended World War I. he crossed the Atlantic and was assigned to Camp Leach, Washington D.C.

=== Government surplus and Europe ===
Holmdahl's World War I records were lost during a fire at the Federal Documents Depository in St. Louis, along with much of the documentary evidence of his World War I service. In an interview given to the Los Angeles Times in 1967, Owen W. Miller of Hermosa Beach, California, who served with him in the Engineers in France recalled.

He was quite a mystery man. The rest of us were construction men but he was obviously a soldier of great experience. Later he transformed from the engineers to a combat regiment.

According to his nephew Gordon Holmdahl of Dublin, California, "Uncle Emil returned from France with a stomach full of shrapnel." Meed surmises Holmdahl's World War I service

Holmdahl had more than fulfilled the vows he made to those who had arranged his pardon. he had promised to serve his country well during the war, and he did.

Captain Holmdahl remained at Camp Leach until early July, where he was assigned to a government surplus sales department. Possibly because of his language skills and his knowledge of railway equipment, he sailed to France on July 17. In addition to disposing of railway tracks, engines, flatcars, and bridging equipment left behind after the departure of the A.E.F., Holmdahl was authorized to sell various components of artillery shells and small arms ammunition piled up in warehouses both in France and the United States. After a month in Paris, Holmdahl traveled to Madrid, Spain to arrange sales of surplus locomotives and railroad supplies to the Spanish government. Holmdahl underwent more government trips, including to the UK and Poland.

In September, his work completed, he returned the U.S., where he commanded a desk at the Traffic Division at the Office of the Director of Sales for the War Department. Meed surmises, "...[the job] had dubious appeal to a man of Holmdahl's temperament."

Holmdahl resigned his army commission, leaving the army for good on June 1, 1920.

== Drifting ==
=== Shooting incident ===
After his discharge from the army, Holmdahl returned to El Paso, where he became involved in a shooting scrape.

Holmdahl, and a friend were searching for a place for a Sunday lunch when they were attracted by guitar music coming from a restaurant. After entering the restaurant, a deputy constable named W.C. Boyle burst through the door and screamed "Put up your hands!" Holmdahl spun around as Boyle fired a shot from his revolver which struck a man named W.E. Davis, an innocent bystander.

Holmdahl shouted "Don't do that," grabbed the constable's hand and twisted the pistol out of his hands. The badly wounded Davis, with a bullet in his side was brought to a nearby hospital by Holmdahl and Boyle. The constable suddenly disappeared when Holmdahl called the police, and Boyle was later arrested and charged with assault to kill.

The constable later stated he had intended to arrest a felon in the restaurant, but his revolver went off, hitting Davis by accident. Police officials said Boyle had a habit of staging "wild west stunts." Davis survived; Boyle went to the hospital, as a result of Holmdahl twisting the gun out of his hand.

=== Treasure hunting ===
Holmdahl would become obsessed with finding Villa's treasure buried by Tomás Urbina, and he sought to find it. Folklore had it that Villa hid millions of dollars in gold bullion somewhere in the Sierra Madre.

According to a newspaper account written by William C. Stewart, a Los Angeles Times Staff writer who knew Holmdahl.

Holmdahl began thinking of Villa's treasure buried by Urbina and he set out to try and find it. He was accompanied by the reformed train robber and later movie actor; Al Jennings, who had transferred his activists from Oklahoma to Los Angeles.

It is unknown how Holmdahl met Al Jennings, the former train robber and gang leader.

The two prepared to lead an expedition in Durango to find Villa's treasure. Holmdahl and Jennings collected a motley group of Mexicans for a bodyguard and set out for Urbina's old ranch. Before they could reach the spot a group of Mexican laborers stumbled on the fabled cache. The two treasure hunters were soon forced to leave by local police, and were lucky to leave Mexico alive.

This failure would not stop Holmdahl as he would organize several more treasure hunting expeditions to try and find the gold. Meed speculates Holmdahl was using the expeditions for more "secretive activities"

One such headline reported:

Gun-running Plot Exposed. Adventurer Blamed in Conspiracy. Federal Officials Seek 'Master Mind' Attempting to Send Munitions to Insurrectos

The story asserted federal police officers in San Francisco and Los Angeles were "close on the trail" of the man who was behind a plot to smuggle contraband rifles and ammunition to Central American rebels. According to police, the guns were received at San Francisco, trucked to Los Angeles, and then loaded onto fishing boats.

The newspaper reported:

While a dozen or more men may be involved in the asserted plot, most of them are merely paid employees. The Federal officers here are said to be primarily concerned with capturing an American adventurer who is believed to have engineered the purchase of the contraband weapons.

Among other adventures, Holmdahl cruised Mexican and Latin American Pacific coastal waters in a large yacht named Paxinosa. The craft, pictured in a Los Angeles newspaper, was described as a two-masted ketch of twenty-one tons equipped with and auxiliary gasoline engine. The story naming the owner and guests listed one "E.L. Humdahl [sic] formerly a colonel of the Maderista forces in Mexico" as a passenger.

The story headlined, "Craft Paxinosa Veers Southward For Cruise In Deep Waters," and reported they were "completely equipped and provisioned for deep sea cruising... around Lower California and west coast ports and other places of interests." Meed surmises that it was "possible that Holmdahl was relaxing on a pleasure curise," but perhaps he was Meed continues "reconnoitering." Meed concludes it is interesting Holmdahl "would keep such a newspaper story for more than forty years."

Holmdahl continued his association with Al Jennings, and in early February 1926, the two and a Los Angeles businessman, Fred T. Hughes, bought 32,400 acres of land on a hacienda named Corral de Piedra, ("Rock Corral.") Located at Rosario, sixty miles south of Parral. The land was supposed to contain two placer mines and one hard-rock mine, with deposits of gold, silver, and copper.

Jennings would then piously announce that he "would no longer pilot sinners down the sawdust trail to God." After a failed campaign for the Democratic Party's nomination for governor of Oklahoma (he finished third,) Jennings went into California real estate.

It is unclear how the mine worked but, but the partnership between Holmdahl, Jennings, and Hughes fell apart.

=== Villa's Head Incident ===
In February 1926, Holmdahl was in the Durango Mountains not far from Parral, searching for gold bars with Alberto Corral, a cousin of Laz Corral, one of Villa's many wives. Meed speculates he was looking for either Villa's purported buried treasure or for more gold hidden by Thomas Urbina. Holmdahl and Corral found the hidden treasure in a cave on the side of a cliff. With the help of two Indians, they lowered the gold 500 feet to the ground.

As they were lowering the twelve-kilogram gold bars into their automobile, they were accosted by bandits. After facing down the not so determined bandits, Holmdahl and Corral drove to Parral. As they parked their car in front of their hotel, they were surrounded by police with guns drawn who arrested them. Within minutes Holmdahl and Corral were thrown into the Parral jail. Soon more than 2,000 gathered in front of the jail screaming for blood. Holmdahl later recalled "I thought we were going to be lynched". The next morning, the two treasure hunters were marched to a bullet-pocketed wall. As they stared at a firing squad, they were accused of mutilating the body of Pancho Villa, who had been assassinated 3 years previously. They were told to confess or be shot on the spot. Holmdahl said, at the time thought episode was a plot to steal their gold but replied he didn't know what they talking about and maintained his innocence. They were only poor prospectors, he maintained. Surprisingly they were led back to their cells, but only for the moment.

The police had acted on a tip that Holmdahl was responsible for the disappearance of Villa's head, and had reports had that he been seen making round at the Parral bars. Police searched their automobile, and found a mysterious bottle which, police said smelled like embalming fluid. They also confiscated a blood stained axe, a large machete-like knife, and a shovel. They never found the gold bars.

At the police station, Holmdahl was asked what he was doing in Parral, and the previous night. Holmdahl replied he was prospecting for copper deposits in the nearby mountains for his employer, the American smelting and refining company. On the night in question, Holmdahl said he and his friends were relaxing by driving around and drinking at a number of Parral cantinas. Holmdahl was accused of using embalming fluid to preserve the severed head. Holmdahl claimed the bottle only contained mineral water. He told the officers he had a serious kidney condition from drinking too much tequila. He said the constantly drank the water to help with stomach pain. Police led Holmdahl and his two companions to cells in the Parral calabozo to await a hearing from a local judge. The bottle, a key piece of evidence, was put into custody at the police station.

Hours later, and American mining engineer named Bryan Brown, who knew Holmdahl visited his cell and anxiously asked if he could be of any help. Holmdahl rather smugly, told him, "Don't worry. I don't have the head and I'm fully protected". The next morning, Holmdahl and Corral were hauled into court. When the police prosecutor testified that the bloodied axe was probably used to chop off Villa's head, Holmdahl replied that since Villa had been dead for more than three years there would not be any blood. Besides, he said, when he and his friends were prospecting in the mountains, they shot a dear, chopped it up, cooked it, and ate it. The same explanation held for the knife. Confronted for the shovel, Holmdahl said it had been used to dig their car out of a ditch. He later told newspaper, "I had a hard time explaining how fresh mud came to be on the shovel." Then he was told his automobile was seen near the graveyard at 9:00 p.m. the night the graveyard was looted. "That had me stumped. We had sure driven near the graveyard, but I explained our route from the mining deposits had taken me by the cemetery" He responded.

Throughout the interrogation, the presiding judge seemed disinterested in the proceedings until the police held up the bottle taken from Holmdahl's car. Placing the bottle on the evidence table, the prosecutor demanded to know why he was carrying embalming fluid in his car. Holmdahl appealed to the judge, "Your honor it is only mineral water. I must drink it because I have a bad liver from drinking too much tequila." Striding to the evidence table, he picked up the bottle, saying, "If this is embalming liquid it will kill me." Before an astonished court, he lifted the bottle to his lips and in half a dozen gulps drained it. "Es verdad, I am innocent" he announced.

The judge, impressed with this bravado performance slammed down his gavel and pronounced "Case dismissed. Release these men" There were those who were cynical about the Mexican justice system, and there were many, later maintained it was not possible for a police custodian, in receipt of a sizable gratuity, emptied the bottle of its contents and refilled it with water. And a judge for political reasons may have been eager to dismiss the case.

Holmdahl later told historian Bill MacGaw that the judge was worried about their safety, as the streets were filled with outraged Villa supporters. When he offered a squad of escort of local soldiers, Holmdahl refused as he believed the escort would shoot them in the back. Holmdahl and Corral were given their guns back, and with pistols in their belts strode out onto the courtyard. They returned to their hotel with no incident. They packed their bags, got into their automobiles, and headed out on the road to Juarez. The gold bars had been stolen, while Villa supporters tried to ambush them on the road, but Holmdahl recounted "Though we were attacked several times between Parral and Juarez we got through. I'm still a pretty good shot." they would cross the border into El Paso and safety.

Holmeahl later advanced the theory that the decapacitation was planned by Plutarco Elias Calles, who succeeded Alvaro Obregon as president of Mexico in 1924. A revolution was being planned by old Villa supporters, and Holmdahl claimed the theft was designed to lure the plotters to Parral where Calles would "disappear them". Holmdahls theory convinced no one.

Holmdahl maintained his innocence until his death, the suspicion remains that he stole the head for an American customer. While there are many theories of who vandalized Villa's grave and who took the head, one rumor claims that Villa's skull ended up in the secret Skull and Bones Society at Yale University.

=== Speculation ===
Ben F Williams, an El Paso cattleman and merchant, in his memoirs, Let the Tail Go With the Hide published in 1984, wrote that he and Holmdahl were good friends who often dined at El Paso's Central Cafe. Williams wrote that in March 1926, he and Holmdahl were having a number of drinks together when Holmdahl said he had taken the head and was paid $25,000, plus expenses, for doing the job. Years later, Williams was in Phoenix visiting a friend named Frank Brophy, a graduate of Yale University and a member of the university's Skull and Bones Club. Brophy told him that he and four other friends each put up $5,000 and hired Holmdahl to get the head. Holmdahl delivered it, and Pancho Villa's battered skull, according to Brophy, is now lodged in the trophy room at the club's head quarters at Yale.

A friend of Holmdahl, named L.M Shadbolt revealed that in 1928 he met Holmdahl in El Paso. Holmdahl entered his room in the Sheldon Hotel, unwrapped a bundle of newspapers and out rolled Villa's head. "I'm going to get $5,000 for it," Holmdahl said.

Nothing more was heard about the skull until it became an issue in the presidential election year of 1988 when Vice President George Bush, running for president was accused of knowing it's whereabouts. Bush, a Yale alumnus was a member of the Skull and Bones Club, which it was said, had a collection of skulls of both the famous and infamous on display in their clubhouse.

Holmdahl, for the rest of his life, continued to deny he was guilty. But for all his denials the most plausible scenario is that he cut of Villa's head and delivered it to the pilot of the airplane landing at Parral the night of the decapitation.

== Later Years ==
=== Aftermath ===
The accusation that he had been the culprit who chopped off Villa's head dogged Holmdahl for years. In Chihuahua, aging veterans who had ridden Villa song the ballad of La Decapitacion, who accused Holmdahl of stealing the head for money. Some vowed to kill him.

A friend of Holmdahl, told William C. Stewart, a Los Angeles reporter, "Don't use my name. I don't want to be gunned down if I ever go back to Mexico" He then related that he and Holmdahl and two other men were drinking in a Mexican Catina, when a woman slipped over to their table and warned that old Villa comrades were outside with machine guns. They were, she said going to shoot Holmdahl and his friends when they left the bar. "Holmdahl just shrugged and stayed there. But the rest of us were made of lesser stuff." The other three ran out the back door, called a taxi and beat it across the border. What happened after that is not known; Holmdahl would emerge unscathed.

=== Interviews and fame ===
"Revolutions are scarce," Holmdahl complained to Stewart during an interview, "and those you do find have all the sportsmanship drained out of them by graft. It's getting to be like prize fights, no patriotism anymore, everyone wants to be president."

Reminiscing years later, Holmdahl told Stewart,

Fifty years ago a man could to Mexico or Central America and take his pick of a dozen wars, insurrections or marauding expeditions. But the rules changed and soldiers of fortune have to admit that free-lance fighting is a thing of the past. This world has gone to hell.

Whole things were cooling off in Mexico, Holmdahl at lose ends gave a series of interviews to newspaper reporters. Being interview about his adventures continued throughout his life. Now in forties, he expounded on his many adventures, waxed philosophic about Mexico, talked about joining foreign armies, sometimes promoted some project or scheme, and enjoyed the attention and fame. In many of his adventures, the facts were badly skewed either because he exaggerated, or, more likely because of reporters' ignorance who garbled names and places in improbable sequences.

In the summer of 1926, Holmdahl announced he was going to join the forces of Abd el-Krim, whose Riff guerrillas were fighting the French in Morocco. "Of course the Riffs will be defeated, but I've always liked fighting with the underdogs."

On June, 1926, the El Paso Herald quoted Holmdahl

I may go to Damasus to fight with the Druses against the French. I had a mysterious note (now in the Holmdahl papers ) it said 'if you wanted to take up the case of the underdog... go to the Druse mountains in Syria... and see some real fighting between the French and the Druses.' I was figuring on going to fight with the Riffs but they've quit. I don't know where i'll go next... Life is all a gamble anyway. I may get killed some of these days fighting but at that I'd rather go that way than be run down by a fivver"

=== Disappearance of Aimee Semple ===
When a reporter asked if Holmdahl had been involved in the alleged kidnapping of famous California Aimee Semple McPherson, he enigmatically replied, "Well, maybe I did and maybe I didn't." Meed shut down this theory saying "McPherson's kidnapping was a farce. She faked the dramatic story of her abduction and escape from Mexico to cover up a sexual tyrst with a member of her flock"

=== First Marriage and Bootlegging ===
When a reporter asked, "Why haven't you ever married?" Holmdahl replied, "I am to those." He pointed to his knife, pistol, and cartridges.

On April 7, 1927, while in Brownwood, Texas on Business, Holmdahl told a reporter.

I planned on going to the defense of Shanghai against the Cantonese, but when the Americans and British stepped in I decided not to go. Before that I expected a ship for Nicaragua but halted when American Marines were sent to that war torn country. For I intended to take sides with the rebels and I couldn't fight my own countrymen."

The reporter described Holmdahl as "Tall, grey haired and erect as a pine, despite his 44 years spent among battle and bloodshed."

According to Gordon Holmdahl, sometime during 1929 Holmdahl married a woman named Ann. She apparently was a lady who desired a settled, well-to-do type of homelife and within a very short time the marriage failed

On January 4, 1930, Holmdahl made the news again when a Phoenix Gazette headline reported, "ADVENTURER RUNS RUM TO GET THRILL - EMIL HOLMDAHL SAYS HE WAS TIRED OF SITTING ALONE IN HOTEL." The story reported that while prohibition was in effect, Holmdahl, restless and wandering, was arrested for transporting 254 pints of whiskey of El Paso and fifty pints of beer. Following his detention a hundred miles east of El Paso, he denied being a bootlegger, claiming boredom, not money, was the motive for his action and that the whole episode was a thrill-seeking stunt.

== Death ==
Emil Lewis Holmdahl died "on April 8, 1963, while loading his automobile with his prospecting tools..."

== Bibliography ==
- Meed, Douglas (2003). Soldier of Fortune: Adventuring in Latin America and Mexico with Emil Lewis Holmdahl. Houston, Texas: Halycon Press Ltd. ISBN 1931823057.
- von Feilitzsch, Heribert (2012). Felix A. Sommerfeld: Spymaster in Mexico, 1908 to 1914. Amissville, Virginia: Henselstone Verlag. ISBN 9780985031701. OL 25414251M.
