= Battle of Cuernavaca =

Battle in the Mexican Revolution

- Part of the Mexican Revolution
Date	Summer, 1912
Location	Cuernavaca, Morelos, Mexico
Result	Government Victory

Belligerents
Government: Federales; Maderistas	Zapatistas

Commanders and leaders
E.L Holmdahl	Emiliano Zapata (WIA)

Strength
50	50–100

Casualties and losses
Unknown	Unknown, but heavy

The Battle of Cuernavaca was a battle during the Mexican Revolution, where Emiliano Zapata and his supporters rebelling against president Francisco I. Madero, who had recently overthrown the previous president Porfirio Díaz. Zapata was patrolling around his stronghold in the hills of Cuernavaca, where he was ambushed by a government force of Rurales under the command of the American Soldier of Fortune, Emil Lewis Holmdahl.

== Plan of Ayala and Zapata's rebellion against Madero ==
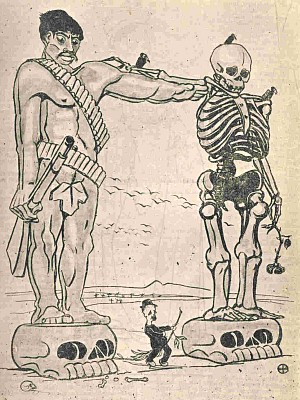
Caricature of Zapata as a naked savage embracing death, both with vultures on their heads, with Francisco Madero riding an olive branch of peace under the "arch of triumph".

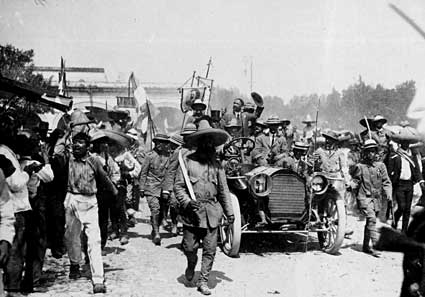
Francisco I. Madero, Zapata, in Cuernavaca. Zapata rebelled against Madero in 1911, because of Madero's slowness to implement land reform.

Compromises between the Madero and Zapata failed in November 1911, days after Madero was elected president. Zapata and Otilio Montaño Sánchez, a former school teacher, fled to the mountains of southwest Puebla. There they promulgated the most radical reform plan in Mexico, the Plan de Ayala (Plan of Ayala). The plan declared Madero a traitor, named as head of the revolution Pascual Orozco, the victorious general who captured Ciudad Juárez in 1911 forcing the resignation of Díaz. He outlined a plan for true land reform.

Zapata had supported the ouster of Díaz and had the expectation that Madero would fulfill the promises made in the Plan of San Luis Potosí to return village lands. He did not share Madero's vision of democracy built on particular freedoms and guarantees that were meaningless to peasants:

Freedom of the press for those who cannot read; free elections for those who do not know the candidates; proper legal for those who have anything to do with an attorney. All those democratic principles, all those great words that gave such joy to our fathers and grandfathers have lost their magic for the people... With or without elections, with or without an effective law, with the Porfirian dictatorship or with Madero's democracy with a controlled or free press, its fate remains the same.

The 1911 Plan of Ayala called for all lands stolen under Díaz to be immediately returned; there had been considerable land fraud under the old dictator, so a great deal of territory was involved. It also stated that large plantations owned by a single person or family should have one-third of their land nationalized, which would then be required to be given to poor farmers. It also argued that if any large plantation owner resisted this action, they should have the other two-thirds confiscated as well. The Plan of Ayala also invoked the name of President Benito Juárez, one of Mexico's great liberal leaders, and compared the taking of land from the wealthy to Juarez's actions when land was expropriated from the Catholic church during the Liberal Reform. Another part of the plan stated that rural cooperatives and other measurements should be put in place to prevent the land from being seized or stolen in the future.

In the following weeks, the development of military operations "betray(ed) good evidence of clear and intelligent planning." During Orozco's rebellion, Zapata fought Mexican troops in the south near Mexico City. In the original design of the armed force, Zapata was a mere colonel among several others; however, the true plan that came about through this organization lent itself to Zapata. Zapata believed that the best route of attack would be to center the fighting and action in Cuautla. If this political location could be overthrown, the army would have enough power to "veto anyone else's control of the state, negotiate for Cuernavaca or attack it directly, and maintain independent access to Mexico City as well as escape routes to the southern hills." However, in order to gain this great success, Zapata realized that his men needed to be better armed and trained.

The first line of action demanded that Zapata and his men "control the area behind and below a line from Jojutla to Yecapixtla." When this was accomplished it gave the army the ability to complete raids as well as wait. As the opposition of the Federal Army and police detachments slowly dissipated, the army would be able to eventually gain powerful control over key locations on the Interoceanic Railway from Puebla City to Cuautla. If these feats could be completed, it would gain access to Cuautla directly and the city would fall.

The 1911 Plan of Ayala called for all lands stolen under Díaz to be immediately returned; there had been considerable land fraud under the old dictator, so a great deal of territory was involved. It also stated that large plantations owned by a single person or family should have one-third of their land nationalized, which would then be required to be given to poor farmers. It also argued that if any large plantation owner resisted this action, they should have the other two-thirds confiscated as well. The Plan of Ayala also invoked the name of President Benito Juárez, one of Mexico's great liberal leaders, and compared the taking of land from the wealthy to Juarez's actions when land was expropriated from the Catholic church during the Liberal Reform. Another part of the plan stated that rural cooperatives and other measurements should be put in place to prevent the land from being seized or stolen in the future.

In the following weeks, the development of military operations "betray(ed) good evidence of clear and intelligent planning." During Orozco's rebellion, Zapata fought Mexican troops in the south near Mexico City. In the original design of the armed force, Zapata was a mere colonel among several others; however, the true plan that came about through this organization lent itself to Zapata. Zapata believed that the best route of attack would be to center the fighting and action in Cuautla. If this political location could be overthrown, the army would have enough power to "veto anyone else's control of the state, negotiate for Cuernavaca or attack it directly, and maintain independent access to Mexico City as well as escape routes to the southern hills." However, in order to gain this great success, Zapata realized that his men needed to be better armed and trained.

The first line of action demanded that Zapata and his men "control the area behind and below a line from Jojutla to Yecapixtla." When this was accomplished it gave the army the ability to complete raids as well as wait. As the opposition of the Federal Army and police detachments slowly dissipated, the army would be able to eventually gain powerful control over key locations on the Interoceanic Railway from Puebla City to Cuautla. If these feats could be completed, it would gain access to Cuautla directly and the city would fall.

The plan of action was carried out successfully in Jojutla. However, Pablo Torres Burgos, the commander of the operation, was disappointed that the army disobeyed his orders against looting and ransacking. The army took complete control of the area, and it seemed as though Torres Burgos had lost control over his forces prior to this event. Shortly after, Torres Burgos called a meeting and resigned from his position. Upon leaving Jojutla with his two sons, he was surprised by a federal police patrol who subsequently shot all three of the men on the spot. This seemed to some to be an ending blow to the movement, because Torres Burgos had not selected a successor for his position; however, Zapata was ready to take up where Torres Burgos had left off.

Shortly after Torres Burgos's death, a party of rebels elected Zapata as "Supreme Chief of the Revolutionary Movement of the South". This seemed to be the fix to all of the problems that had just arisen, but other individuals wanted to replace Zapata as well. Due to this new conflict, the individual who would come out on top would have to do so by "convincing his peers he deserved their backing."

Zapata finally gained the support necessary by his peers and was considered a "singularly qualified candidate". This decision to make Zapata the leader of the revolution in Morelos did not occur all at once, nor did it ever reach a true definitive level of recognition. In order to succeed, Zapata needed a strong financial backing for the battles to come. This came in the form of 10,000 pesos delivered by Rodolfo from the Tacubayans. Due to this amount of money Zapata's group of rebels became one of the strongest in the state financially.

After a period Zapata became the leader of his "strategic zone", which gave him power and control over the actions of many more individual rebel groups and thus greatly increased his margin of success. "Among revolutionaries in other districts of the state, however, Zapata's authority was more tenuous." After a meeting between Zapata and Ambrosio Figueroa in Jolalpan, it was decided that Zapata would have joint power with Figueroa with regard to operations in Morelos. This was a turning point in the level of authority and influence that Zapata had gained and proved useful in the direct overthrow of Morelos.

== Battle ==
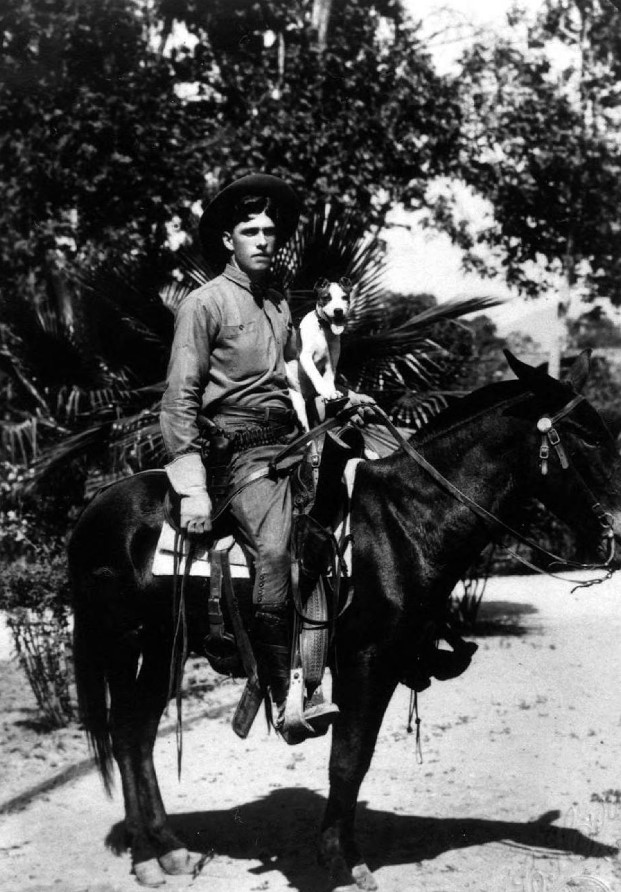
Emil Holmdahl and his pet dog during the campaign against Zapata. a stray bullet hit the dog during Battle of Cuernavaca

By now Zapata's men controlled nearly all of southern Mexico, which made Madero desperate enough to recall the most hated man in Mexico, General Victoriano Huerta to lead a campaign against Zapata. Huerta's men crushed Zapata's men in the field and committed brutal atrocities against the civilian populous, at point ordering General Juvencio Robles to "hang them from trees like ear rings".

The Maderistas dispatched an American Soldier of Fortune Emil Lewis Holmdahl to patrol near Cuernavaca. Holmdahl had fought in both the Spanish–American War and Philippine–American War, as well as during the Boxer Rebellion and Moro Rebellion, and would be promoted to Sergeant. Upon his discharge from the Army, Holmdahl became a soldier of fortune and mercenary fighting under the likes of "General" Lee Christmas and others in Central and South America. Holmdahl would then become a spy and soldier during the Mexican Revolution. Holmdahl became a captain in the Rurales under the command of Emilio Kosterlitzky, and had repelled a raid in late October, 1910. Holmdahl would later create his own faction and would conquer most of Nayarit, before being defeated at Tepic and would later join rebel Martín Espinosa in capturing Rosario, Rosamorada, and Tepic. The two allies later turned on each other and culminated in the Battle of Tepic. Holmdahl would later join Madero's forces in Spring of 1911, and would take part in the Battle of Ciudad Juárez, and would soon be promoted to major.

One morning, Holmdahl and his troop were patrolling near a Zapata stronghold in the hills of Cuernavaca, when they surprised a small detachment of soldiers. Their massive sombreros and slung rifles identified them as Zapatistas and Holmdahl barked "Adelante Compañeros" ("Let's Go Comrades!"). His Bugler blew the charge, his men shouted their battle cries, and deploying spurred into a wild gallop. The Zapatistas turned their horses and scrambled into a head long retreat. During the running gun battle, Holmdahl's men accurately firing their 6-shooters began to empty saddles as the Zapatistas dropped dead on the ground. The Zapatistas were at an immediate disadvantage as twisting in a saddle of a racing horse to fire over your shoulder at a moving target is ineffectual at best. In their favor however, was knowledge of every trail and terrain and soon survivors began to outdistance their pursuers. In the melee however, a stray bullet found its mark and blew Holmdahl's pet dog off the saddle and killed him instantly.

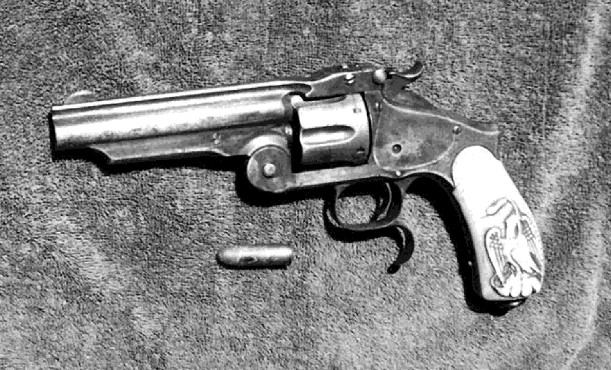
Zapata's pistol, obtained by Holmdahl. Zapata's name is scratched on the ivory handle.

Holmdahl identified one of the fleeing riders as Zapata himself, dressed in black charro clothes, riding a big white stallion and turning in the saddle, Zapata was firing his revolver at Holmdahl, who returned fire and almost immediately stuck Zapata in arm with his own gun and caused him to drop his pistol, and he was barely able to remain in the saddle and gallop away cursing Holmdahl. After their bugler blew recall, the exhilarated Rurales and their exhausted horses regrouped and their group retraced the route of their pursuit along the trail. Along the trail, Holmdahl spotted the fallen revolver of Zapata, and he snatched it from his saddle. The pistol was a "Russian" Model Smith & Wesson .44 caliber, single action, top-break action revolver, which fired a powerful 246-grain lead slug. Holmdahl examined the gun, which contained carved ivory handles, which replaced the standard-issue grips. On one side was a raised sculpture of the Mexican eagle grasping a snake in its beak and on the side was "EMILIO [sic.] ZAPATA GENERAL EN CUARVACA [sic.] MORALES MEX MARZO 4 1911."

== Aftermath ==
Zapata was pacified for the time being, although he continued to remain a thorn in the government's side until Madero's assassination.

== Sources ==
- Meade, Teresa A. (2016) [2010]. "Revolution from Countryside to City: Mexico". History of Modern Latin America: 1800 to the Present (2nd ed.). Chichester: Wiley-Blackwell. pp. 161–179. ISBN 978-1-118-77248-5. OCLC 960231660.
- Meed, Douglas (2003). Soldier of Fortune: Adventuring in Latin America and Mexico with Emil Lewis Holmdahl. Houston, Texas: Halycon Press Ltd.
- Womack, John (1968). Zapata and the Mexican Revolution. New York: Vintage. ISBN 978-0-394-70853-9. LCCN 68-23947. OCLC 229185765.
