= Raid on Buena Noche =

Battle in the Mexican Revolution

Raid on Buena Noche (1911)
- Part of the Mexican Revolution
Date	February, 1911
Location	Buena Noche Mine, near Rosario Sinaloa, Mexico
Result	Holmdahlist Victory: 27 cases of dynamite stolen

Belligerents
Holmdahlist	Government

Commanders and leaders
E.L Holmdahl	Unknown

Strength
22	Unknown

Casualties and losses
None	Unknown

The Raid on Buena Noche was a raid during the Mexican Revolution where supporters of the American soldier of fortune Emil Lewis Holmdahl, raided the Buena Noche Mine, near Rosario.

== Raid ==
Holmdahl established a stronghold deep in the mountains following his defeat at Tepic, and only a few weeks later he began making preparations to raid the Buena Noche Mine near Rosario, where he hoped to steal enough dynamite to start a bomb factory from where he could launch an attack upon Rosario itself.

With a band of 22 men Holmdahl raided the mine, where he stole 27 cases of dynamite.

== Aftermath ==
Holmdahl started a bomb factory at his mountain hideout, and when enough were constructed he was ready to attack Rosario alongside Martin Epsinosa.

== Sources ==
- Meed, Douglas (2003). Soldier of Fortune: Adventuring in Latin America and Mexico with Emil Lewis Holmdahl. Houston, Texas: Halcyon Press Ltd. ISBN 1931823057. LCCN 2002011345. OCLC 50253068. OL 3555536M.
- History of Nayarit. 2019.
- Mountjoy, Joseph B. (2013). "Aztatlan Complex". In Evans, Susan T.; Webster, David L. (eds.). Archaeology of Ancient Mexico and Central America: An Encyclopedia. Routledge. doi:10.4324/9780203827512.
- Taylor, Lawrence D. (1999). "The Magonista Revolt in Baja California". The Journal of San Diego History. 45 (1).
