= Mexican Southern Railroad =

Overview
- Locale: Mexico
- Dates of operation: 1892–1936
- Successor: Ferrocarriles Nacionales de México

The Mexican Southern Railroad was a passenger and freight railroad in Mexico connecting Oaxaca with Puebla. It was chartered in 1881 by a consortium of Mexican and American investors including former President Ulysses S. Grant. Construction delays plagued the company and by 1885, it was bankrupt. Under new ownership, construction was completed in 1892. The line became profitable for its owners until nationalized in 1936.

== Investors ==
Two of the railroad's founders

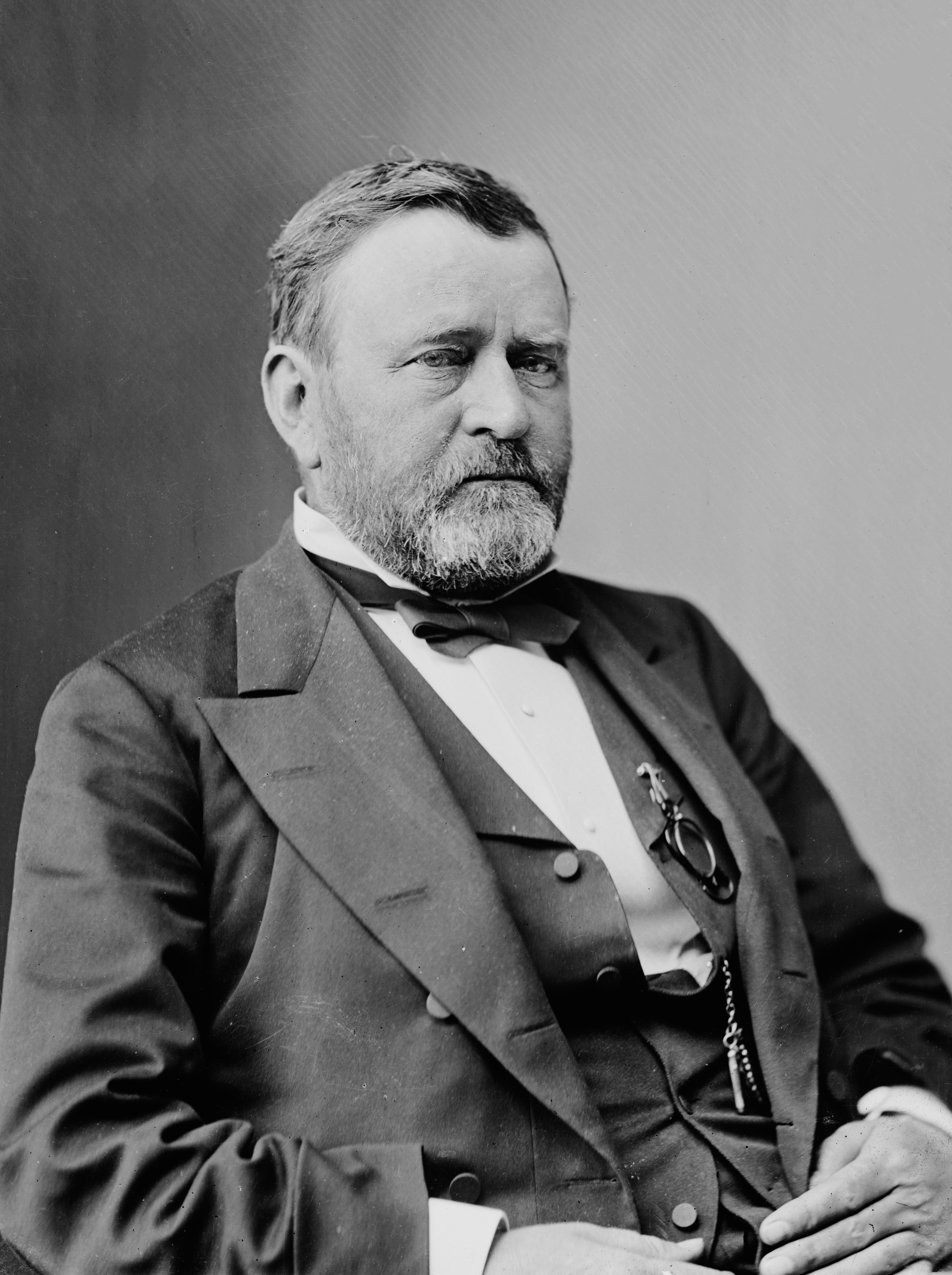
Ulysses S. Grant

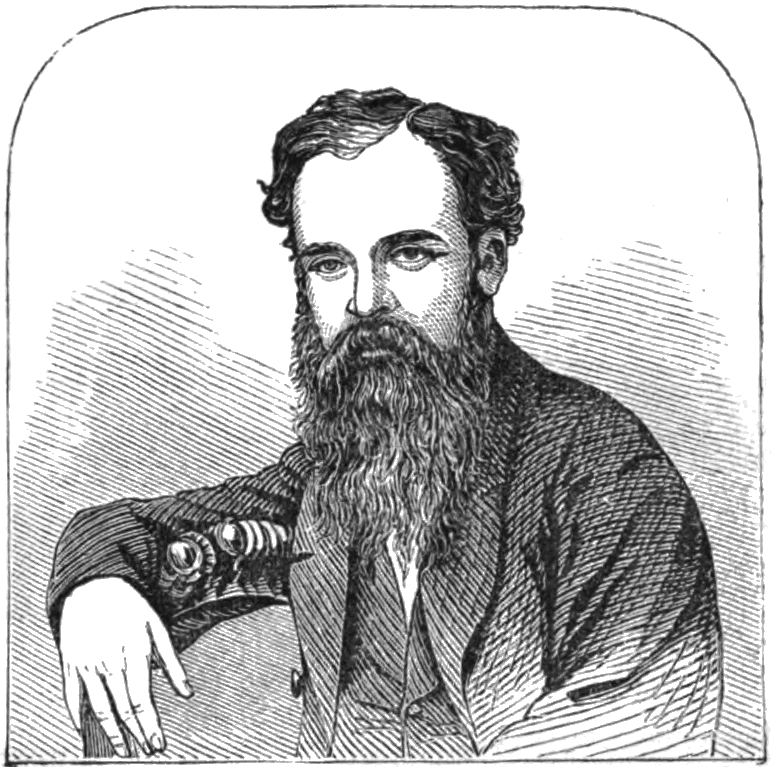
Matías Romero

The idea for the Mexican Southern sprang from discussions between former United States President Ulysses S. Grant and Mexican politician Matías Romero. Romero and Grant had been friends since the late 1860s, when Romero represented Mexico as ambassador to the United States while Grant was serving as commanding general in Washington. Grant had been interested in Mexico since his service there in the Mexican–American War in the 1840s. While there, Grant had developed a sympathy for the Mexican people and later supported their rebellion against Emperor Maximilian, the foreign prince installed by French troops while the United States was fighting its Civil War. After leaving office, Grant visited Mexico in 1880 before attempting to be nominated for a third term as President. When that effort failed, he turned his attention to building a post-presidential career in business.

Romero was also focused on business, and especially with the idea of attracting foreign investment to Mexico. After seeing the success of the Sonora Railway Company in doing so in 1879, he turned his attention to railroads and Grant. Even before the 1880 Republican National Convention, Romero approached Grant about railway promotion. That October, with Grant's political chances foreclosed, Romero visited him in the United States and offered him the presidency of a potential railroad, which he hoped to build south from Mexico City to the Guatemala border. The governor of the southern Mexican state of Oaxaca granted Romero a concession to build there. Romero and Grant held a banquet at Delmonico's in New York City to pitch the idea to wealthy American investors. That winter, they worked to convince the New York state legislature to incorporate the venture, which they did on March 1, 1881. Grant served as president of the new company, with Union Pacific executive Grenville Dodge as vice president and Russell Sage, another railroad man, as treasurer.

== Construction and operation ==
Grant and Romero left for Mexico City later that month. After lobbying the government there for two months, they received permission to construct the railroad, and Grant returned to the United States. The Mexican government's terms included no subsidy and required construction to be complete in ten years. Because of its prominent president, the new venture received a great deal of attention in the American press. Harper's Magazine published an article about it describing the company and its aims:

Its purpose is to operate in Mexico railways and telegraph lines, also to build elevators, and to construct or purchase and navigate steam and sailing vessels as may be proper in connection with the company's business in Mexico. This seems a sufficiently comprehensive scheme to satisfy the most ambitious mind.

The investors' ambition exceeded even that description, as Grant obtained a concession from the Guatemalan government to continue the railroad a further 250 miles into that country. At the same time, Grant joined American President Chester A. Arthur in lobbying Congress to approve a free-trade agreement with Mexico, which they declined to do. Meanwhile, surveying of the Mexican Southern's route continued slowly and by 1883 construction had barely begun. In 1884, the company ran out of money and the northern segment was placed in receivership. The southern segment followed in 1885 with the failure of Grant's other business interests in New York, and the Mexican government declared the charter forfeit. Grant died later that same year.

The Mexican government awarded the Mexican Southern's former charter to Governor Luis Mier y Terán in 1886, but the company was quickly bankrupt again. A British company, Read and Campbell, acquired the company in 1888 and, at last, began construction. The company by then had limited its ambitions to that of a regional railway and only planned to build from Puebla to Oaxaca. Beginning in Puebla, the line reached Tehuacán in January 1891. It reached the Tomellín Canyon later that year. Construction reached Oaxaca City and was complete in November 1892. Mexican President Porfirio Díaz presided over the opening day ceremonies. Two short branches were later constructed out of Oaxaca. The company also acquired a tram line between Tehuacán and Esperanza.

The railroad was successful enough to pay dividends between 1897 and 1914. There was soon enough commerce on the line to require the company to borrow train cars from nearby railroads. Proposals to extend the road to Tehuantepec were raised from time to time, but never executed. In 1909, the Interoceanic Railway of Mexico obtained a lease of the Mexican Southern. The Interoceanic, a division of the Ferrocarriles Nacionales de México, was nationalized in 1936. Mexico privatized the railroads again in 1995, but nearly all passenger rail service, including the Puebla-Oaxaca stretch of line, has been suspended since 1997. The former Oaxaca station was converted to a museum in 2003.

== Sources ==
- Chassen-López, Francie R. (2005). From Liberal to Revolutionary Oaxaca: The View from the South, Mexico 1867–1911. Penn State University Press. ISBN 0-271-02512-3.
- Hardy, Osgood (May 1955). "Ulysses S. Grant, President of the Mexican Southern Railroad". Pacific Historical Review. 24 (2): 111–120. doi:10.2307/3634572. JSTOR 3634572.
- McFeely, William S. (1981). Grant: A Biography. Norton. ISBN 0-393-01372-3.
- Miller, Robert Ryal (May 1965). "Matias Romero: Mexican Minister to the United States during the Juarez-Maximilian Era". The Hispanic American Historical Review. 45 (2): 228–245. doi:10.2307/2510566. JSTOR 2510566.
- "Museo del Ferrocarril Mexicano del Sur". Cultura: Secretaría de Cultura (in Spanish). Red Nacional de Información Cultural. September 17, 2015.
- Pletcher, David (July 1959). "Mexico Opens the Door to American Capital, 1877–1880". The Americas. 16 (1): 1–14. doi:10.2307/979255. JSTOR 979255. S2CID 147141522.
- Powell, Fred Wilbur (1921). The Railroads of Mexico. Stratford. OCLC 1865702.
- Villa, Juan Carlos; Sacristán-Roy, Emilio (April 2013). "Privatization of Mexican Railroads: Fifteen Years Later". Research in Transportation Business & Management. 6: 45–50. doi:10.1016/j.rtbm.2012.11.012.
