= Fall of Tepic =

Battle in the Mexican Revolution

- Part of the Mexican Revolution
| Date | Late March, 1911 |
| Location | Tepic, Nayarit, Mexico |
| Result | Espinosist and Holmdahlist Victory: Tepic is captured; Nayarit is pacified |

Belligerents
| Espinosist; Holmdahlist | Government |

Commanders and leaders
| Martin Epsinosa; E.L Holmdahl | Unknown |

Strength
| Unknown | Unknown |

Casualties and losses
| Unknown | Unknown |

The Fall of Tepic was an action during the Mexican Revolution, where two rebel commanders, Martín Espinosa and the American soldier of fortune, Emil Lewis Holmdahl, captured the provincial capital of Tepic.

== Capture ==
Emil Lewis Holmdahl and Martín Espinosa spent a while cleaning up coastal towns still loyal to Díaz and once most towns had surrendered, Espinosa and Holmdahl entered the provincial capital of Tepic. The federal forces did not offer any resistance to the rebels and soon evacuated the city, while Holmdahl and Espinosa marched into the city and captured it. General Espinosa began to ensconce himself and a growing entourage in the governor's palace and was beginning to plot against Madero.

== Aftermath ==
This resulted in a falling out between Espinosa and Holmdahl, and caused the latter to attack the former in the Battle of Tepic.

== Sources ==
- Soldier of Fortune: Adventuring in Latin America and Mexico with Emil Lewis Holmdahl By Douglas V. Meed
- Nayarit and The Mexican Revolution, 1910-1920 By. Wayne A. Sabesk
- Mountjoy, Joseph B. (2013). "Aztatlan Complex". In Evans, Susan T.; Webster, David L. (eds.). Archaeology of Ancient Mexico and Central America: An Encyclopedia. Routledge
- Taylor, Laurence D (1999) "The Magonista Revolt in Baja California". The Journal of San Diego History.
