= Costa Oeste Campaign =

Military campaign during the Mexican Revolution

- Part of the Mexican Revolution
Date	1910–1911
Location	Nayarit, Mexico
Result	Initial Holmdahlist Victory; Eventual Government Victory

Belligerents
Holmdahlist	Government

Commanders and leaders
E.L Holmdahl	Porfirio Díaz; Emilio Kosterlitzky

Casualties and losses
300 executed	Unknown

The Costa Oeste Campaign was a military campaign during the opening stages of the Mexican Revolution, in which the federal government of Mexican president Porfirio Díaz and the commander of the Rurales, Emilio Kosterlitzky, faced off against supporters of the American soldier of fortune, Emil Lewis Holmdahl.

== Campaign ==
Emil Lewis Holmdahl had previously worked for the Díaz regime as a captain in the Rurales, and security guard for an American railway operating near Mazatlán, and had repelled a raid in 1910. Holmdahl defected from the government forces and resolved to create his own faction. In early January 1911, Holmdahl with his rag tag band of men wreaked havoc on the federalist on the west coast. Holmdahl captured many towns and villages and was able to take control of most of Nayarit. Holmdahl had decided to make preparations to capture the provincial capital of Tepic.

Tepic had a large garrison and strong fortifications, so Holmdahl decided to instigate a jailbreak, however the plan turned into a complete disaster as he was betrayed by deserters and lured into an ambush where many of his men were killed or captured, with 300 men being executed shortly afterwards.

== Aftermath ==
Holmdahl retreated to the hills where he established a mountain stronghold, and only a few weeks later he raided the Buena Noche Mine with 22 men and stole enough dynamite to start a bomb factory.

== Sources ==
- Meed, Douglas (2003). Soldier of Fortune: Adventuring in Latin America and Mexico with Emil Lewis Holmdahl. Houston, Texas: Halycon Press Ltd
- History of Nayarit (2019)
- Mountjoy, Joseph B. (2013). "Aztatlan Complex". In Evans, Susan T.; Webster, David L. (eds.). Archaeology of Ancient Mexico and Central America: An Encyclopedia. Routledge
- Taylor, Laurence D (1999) "The Magonista Revolt in Baja California". The Journal of San Diego History.
