= Capture of Rosario =

Battle in the Mexican Revolution

- Part of the Mexican Revolution
Date	Late February, 1911
Location	Rosario, Sinaloa, Mexico
Result	Espinosist and Holmdahlist Victory: Rosario is Captured

Belligerents
Espinosist; Holmdahlist	Government

Commanders and leaders
Martín Espinosa; E.L Holmdahl	Unknown

Strength
Unknown	Unknown

Casualties and losses
Unknown	Unknown

The Capture of Rosario was an action during the Mexican Revolution, where two rebel commanders, Martin Epsinosa and the American soldier of fortune, Emil Lewis Holmdahl captured the government stronghold of Rosario.

== Capture ==
Martín Espinosa had taken advantage of the ongoing Mexican Revolution to create a separate faction semi-loyal to the cause Francisco Madero. On May 8, Espinosa fought a battle with pro Diaz forces at La Bayona, on the south side of the Cañas River, and the following day captured Tecuala on May 9, and soon began making preparations to capture Rosario, although he lacked the dynamite to do so.

Holmdahl meanwhile was also preparing to capture Rosario but lacked the necessary manpower. Holmdahl and Espinosa decided to join forces as each had what the other wanted, and thus two launched a jointly planned attack upon Rosario. The fighting itself didn't last long and the town fell "quickly". The fall of Rosario was a serious blow for the pro-government forces and allowed the rebels to put pressure on Tepic.

== Aftermath ==
Holmdahl and Espinosa continued their partnership and moved immediately to capture Rosamorada

== Sources ==
- Soldier of Fortune: Adventuring in Latin America and Mexico with Emil Lewis Holmdahl By Douglas V. Meed
- Nayarit and The Mexican Revolution, 1910-1920 By. Wayne A. Sabesk
- Mountjoy, Joseph B. (2013). "Aztatlan Complex". In Evans, Susan T.; Webster, David L. (eds.). Archaeology of Ancient Mexico and Central America: An Encyclopedia. Routledge
- Taylor, Laurence D (1999) "The Magonista Revolt in Baja California". The Journal of San Diego History.
