= Capture of Rosamorada =

Battle in the Mexican Revolution

- Part of the Mexican Revolution
Date	March, 1911
Location	Rosamorada, Sinaloa, Mexico
Result	Espinosist and Holmdahlist Victory: Rosamorada is Captured

Belligerents
Espinosist; Holmdahlist	Government

Commanders and leaders
Martín Espinosa; E.L Holmdahl	Unknown

Strength
3,000	Unknown

Casualties and losses
Unknown	Unknown

The Capture of Rosamorada was an action during the Mexican Revolution, where two rebel commanders, Martín Espinosa and the American soldier of fortune, Emil Lewis Holmdahl captured the government stronghold of Rosamorada.

== Capture ==
Holmdahl and Espinosa decided to continue working together and with a force numbering 3,000 men, they launched an attack upon Rosamorada, where Holmdahl had been imprisoned. Their makeshift army lightly armed, some with only machetes descended upon the town and after a few days of hard fighting the town fell.

== Executions ==
Espinosa ordered the captured troops to be executed to appease his army, although they demanded the 700 prisoners in the cells to be released. Holmdahl soon realized that only a few were political prisoner and rest were murderers. rapists, and thieves and so Holmdahl turned to the crowd and told them the prisoners would be released in the morning as soon as new clothing and funds could be accumulated to give them a new start in life. Holmdahl next went to Espinosa with the predicament that the prisoners would let loose a terror rapine, murder and theft; if they didn't many of their troops would desert in the morning. While Espinosa and his staff pondered, Holmdahl, always the practical man came up with as solution. "Why not" he said "look at the prison book, find out the who the worst murderers, take them out at midnight and shoot them. We won't use regular soldiers for the firing squad, we'll use officers". Espinosa agreed and 112 of the worst killers were selected for execution, and 6 officers were selected to be the firing squad. The criminals were told that if they marched to the town of Acaponeta, they would be pardoned. The thugs were led out in small groups with an officer escort and were halted at a cemetery and then were promptly shot. "This kept us busy the whole night," Holmdahl wrote.

The next morning 500 of the least noxious prisoners were released, while the army cheered. They were given new clothes and 5 pesos to start a new life. When it was noticed that a few prisoners were missing, Espinosa casually remarked that they had been transferred to an army unit at Acaponeta. Holmdahl would later write "Many of the freed turned out to be fine citizens but others later had to executed after a military court martial."

== Aftermath ==
Espinosa and Holmdahl spent a few months cleaning up coast towns still loyal to Porfirio Díaz before finally entering Tepic.

== Sources ==
- Soldier of Fortune: Adventuring in Latin America and Mexico with Emil Lewis Holmdahl By Douglas V. Meed
- Nayarit and The Mexican Revolution, 1910-1920 By. Wayne A. Sabesk
- Mountjoy, Joseph B. (2013). "Aztatlan Complex". In Evans, Susan T.; Webster, David L. (eds.). Archaeology of Ancient Mexico and Central America: An Encyclopedia. Routledge
- Taylor, Laurence D (1999) "The Magonista Revolt in Baja California". The Journal of San Diego History.
