= Raid on Mazatlán Railway =

Battle in the Mexican Revolution

- Part of the Mexican Revolution
Date	Late October, 1910
Location	Mazatlán, Sinaloa, Mexico
Result	Raid Failed: Raiders released unharmed; Stolen horses returned

Belligerents
Government: Federales	Constitutionalists: Maderistas

Commanders and leaders
E.L Holmdahl	Unknown

Strength
100–200	Unknown

Casualties and losses
None	Unknown

The Raid on Mazatlán Railway was a raid launched by supporters of General Francisco I. Madero against the Mazatlán Railway held by supporters of Porfirio Díaz, under the command of the American soldier of fortune, Emil Lewis Holmdahl.

== Mazatlán Railway and Raid ==
In 1909 and 1910, General Francisco I. Madero was in the processing of rebelling against the president of Mexico, Porfirio Díaz and many smaller rebel groups began attacking and raiding settlements under of control of Díaz loyalist. Groups of rebels began launching hit and run style attacks on a key railroad, near the town of Mazatlán in Sinaloa. The gold shipments in particular caused great concern for the leadership of Mazatlán, whose bureaucrats were losing income and profits. In response to these attacks the railroad decided to hire an American soldier of fortune named E.L Holmdahl.

Holmdahl had fought in both the Spanish–American War and Philippine–American War, as well as during the Boxer Rebellion and Moro Rebellion, and would be promoted to Sergeant. Upon his discharge from the Army, Holmdahl became a soldier of fortune and mercenary fighting under the likes of "General" Lee Christmas and others in Central and South America. Holmdahl would then become a spy and soldier during the Mexican Revolution.

Due to Holmdahl's experience it was he who was put in charge of protecting the gold shipments. Holmdahl recruited a decently sized force of 200 men to guard the shipments. Holmdahl trained his men rigorously to fight the "bandits" and had his men patrol alongside the railway and escort the shipments as they progressed. The rebels attempted numerous attacks on the shipments, but each time Holmdahl's men repelled them. Holmdahl would never let an enemy live. Soon there were scores of dead men rotting in the sun. The rebels, instead of continuously attempting to raid instead the shipments, went around Holmdahl's position and raided his camp, stealing 100 horses from the unsuspecting guards, before fleeing into the desert.

== Pursuit and Capture ==
Holmdahl soon received news of the raid and quickly gathered a large posse, numbering most of his strength at around 100-200 men and organized a pursuit. Holmdahl was easily able to track the horse thieves and was able to surround the herd and intercept it's wranglers, and the rebels surrendered immediately. Holmdahl quickly realized these men were not the typical "bandits", but rather peasants due to their appearance and Holmdahl demanded of the peasants "Why did you fools "steal my horses and why should I not hang you?". The peasants began explaining how they served General Madero, who was attempting to liberate them from the cruel crutches of Díaz, and needed the horses not for themselves for the people.

Holmdahl, strong Maderist sympathizer, listened to their story To the surprise of both the rebels and his men, who had already begun tying hangman's knots, he declared, "Not only will I pardon you, I will join you." Holmdahl then resigned his position with the railway, accepted his pay in horses, and took command of the small band of peasants, openly joining the revolutionary cause.

== Aftermath ==
Holmdahl recruited even more men to his motley band of peasants and began to march against the Díaz forces and began to attack a number of West Coast Village's under the control of Díaz loyalist.

== Sources ==
- Meed, Douglas (2003). Soldier of Fortune: Adventuring in Latin America and Mexico with Emil Lewis Holmdahl. Houston, Texas: Halycon Press Ltd
- Taylor, Laurence D (1999) "The Magonista Revolt in Baja California". The Journal of San Diego History.
- History of Mazatlán, Sinaloa (2023)
- Fred Wilbur Powell (1921), the Railroads of Mexico
