= Battle of Tepic (1911) =

Battle in the Mexican Revolution

- Part of the Mexican Revolution
Date	April, 1911
Location	Tepic, Nayarit, Mexico
Result	Espinosist Victory

Belligerents
Holmdahlist	Espinosist

Commanders and leaders
E.L Holmdahl (WIA)	Martín Espinosa

Strength
280 Cora Indians; 7 officers 1 old brass cannon	2,000–5,000

Casualties and losses
193 killed	Unknown

The Battle of Tepic was an engagement during the Mexican Revolution where two former allies, Emil Lewis Holmdahl and Martín Espinosa, turned enemies, fought for control over the provincial capital of Tepic.

== Battle ==
Holmdahl and seven officers were brought before Espinosa, who asked them to join his junta. They refused and then fled to the mountains, from where they joined 280 Cora Indians loyal to Madero. Holmdahl, the seven officers, and the Indians attacked Tepic, armed with bows and arrows and an old brass cannon.

Espinosa and his forces numbered between 2,000 and 5,000 men and were armed with guns. Holmdahl had presumed that Espinosa's men would defect and join their cause. They didn't and the battle erupted into a brutal fight on the city streets. Holmdahl and his men were outnumbered and began to lose ground, while Holmdahl was wounded by a shell that burst near him, killing the man next to him. After 36 hours of fighting, Holmdahl's forces were defeated with two thirds of their men dead including all seven officers.

== Aftermath ==
Holmdahl would disband his faction and join Madero's cause and would distinguish himself during the revolution. Espinosa on the other hand would later lose Tepic, be exiled by Victoriano Huerta, and later be assassinated.

== Sources ==
- Soldier of Fortune: Adventuring in Latin America and Mexico with Emil Lewis Holmdahl By Douglas V. Meed
- Nayarit and The Mexican Revolution, 1910-1920 By. Wayne A. Sabesk
- Mountjoy, Joseph B. (2013). "Aztatlan Complex". In Evans, Susan T.; Webster, David L. (eds.). Archaeology of Ancient Mexico and Central America: An Encyclopedia. Routledge
- Taylor, Laurence D (1999) "The Magonista Revolt in Baja California". The Journal of San Diego History.
