= Jolalpan =

Coordinates: 18.3219°N 98.8444°W

- Municipality
- Location of the municipality in Puebla
- Country: Mexico
- State: Puebla
- Time zone: UTC-6 (Zona Centro)

Jolalpan is a municipality in the Mexican state of Puebla.
