= Teresa Meade =

American historian (born 1948)

Teresa A. Meade
- Born: 1948; Iowa
- Education: PhD, Rutgers University
- Known for: Historian of Latin America

Teresa A. Meade (born 1948) is an American historian. A specialist in Latin American history, she was Professor of History and Culture at Union College in Schenectady, New York.

== Life ==
Teresa Ann Meade was born in Iowa in 1948. She graduated with a B.A. in history from the University of Wisconsin-Madison in 1972. She gained her PhD from Rutgers University in 1984, with a thesis on community protest in Rio de Janeiro between 1890 and 1917.

Meade taught at Union College for many years. In 2000-2001 she was a Fulbright Lecturer in Tokyo. She became Professor of History and Culture, remaining at Union College until her retirement in 2020.

She is a member of the Radical History Review editorial collective, and has been president of the board of trustees of the Journal of Women's History.

== Works ==
- (ed. with Mark Walker) Science, Medicine and Cultural Imperialism. New York : St. Martin's Press, 1991.
- "Civilizing" Rio : reform and resistance in a Brazilian city, 1889-1930. University Park, Pa. : Pennsylvania State University Press, 1997. ISBN 978-0271028705.
- (ed. with Merry E. Wiesner-Hanks) A companion to global gender history. Blackwell, 2004. ISBN 0-631-22393-2 Second ed., 2020.
- A brief history of Brazil. 2004. ISBN 9780816077885
- A history of Latin America: 1800 to the Present. Chichester: Wiley, 2010. 2nd ed., 2016. 3rd ed, 2022, ISBN 9781119719168.
- We Don't Become Refugees by Choice: Mia Truskier, Survival, and Activism from Occupied Poland to California, 1920-2014. Springer Nature, 2021. ISBN 978-3030845278.
