= Interoceanic Railway of Mexico =

Railway system in Mexico

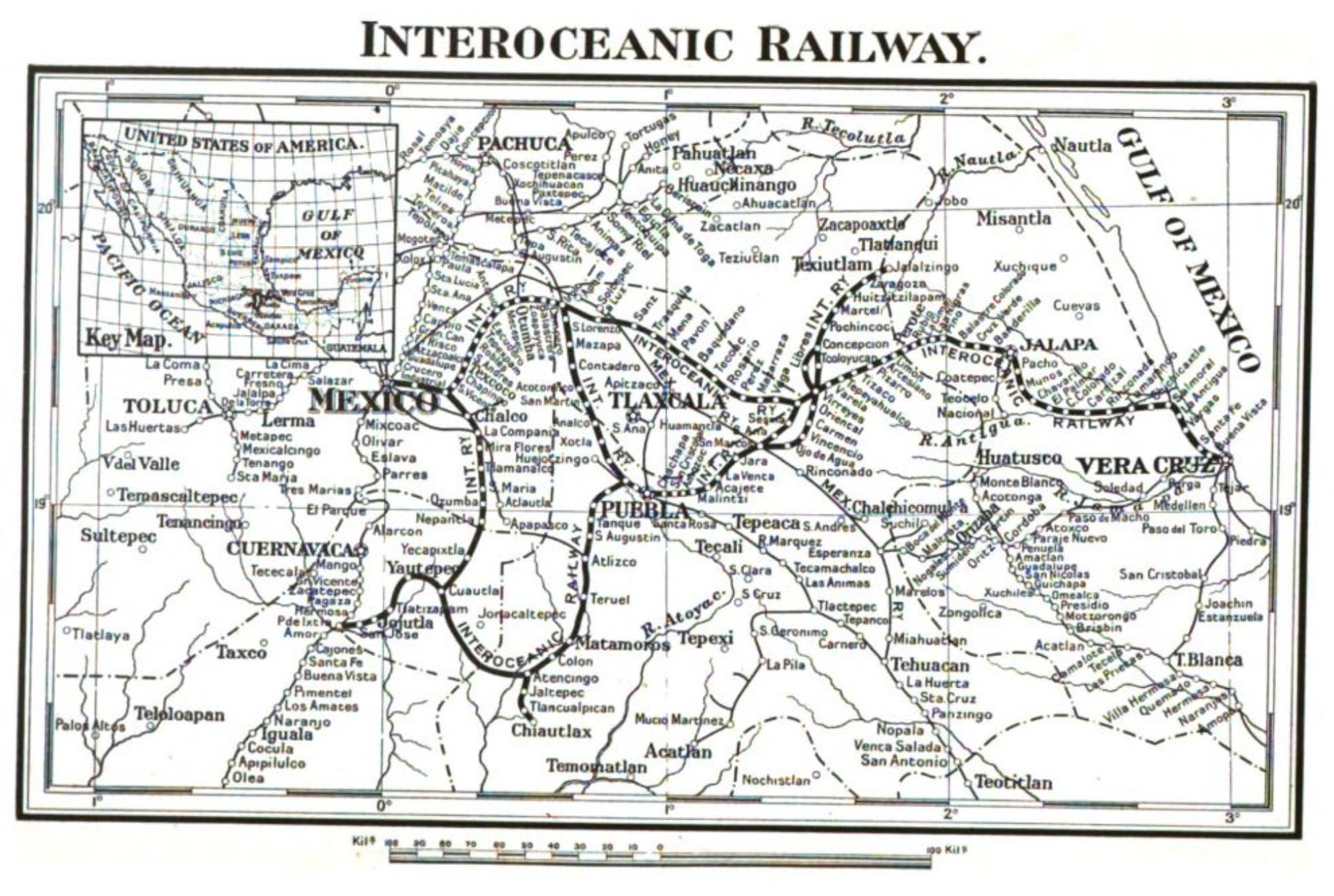
1912 map

The Interoceanic Railway of Mexico (Ferrocarril Interoceánico de México) was one of the primary pre-nationalization railways of Mexico. Incorporated in Great Britain in 1888 to complete an unfinished project and compete with the Mexican Railway, it completed a 3 ft (914 mm) narrow gauge main line from Mexico City to Veracruz in 1891. Branches included Mexico City to Puente de Ixtla (the constructed part of an incomplete line to Acapulco), Puebla to Cuautla, Atencingo to Tlancualpicán, and a cutoff between Oriental and Santa Clara (bypassing Puebla). Through subsidiary Mexican Eastern Railroad, the Interoceanic acquired a branch from San Marcos to Teziutlán in 1902, and in January 1910 it began operating the Mexican Southern Railway from Puebla to Oaxaca under lease. The Mexican government acquired control of the Interoceanic in 1903, and subsequently sold it to the National Railroad of Mexico in exchange for ownership of that company.

Although the National Railroad became part of Ferrocarriles Nacionales de México (National Railways of Mexico) in January 1909, the Interoceanic and its two subsidiaries remained separate companies. Following privatization in the 1990s, Transportación Ferroviaria Mexicana (now Kansas City Southern de México) acquired most of the main line of the former Interoceanic, while several branches, including the old line to Puebla and the Mexican Southern, were assigned to Ferromex. A portion of the former Interoceanic and a station have been preserved as a heritage railway and museum in Cuautla.

== See also ==
- Tren Interoceánico
- Interoceanic Corridor of the Isthmus of Tehuantepec
