= List of conflicts in Mexico =

An orthographic projection map detailing the present-day location and territorial extent of Mexico in North America.

This is a list of conflicts in Mexico arranged chronologically starting from the Pre-Columbian era (Lithic, Archaic, Preclassic, Classic, and Postclassic periods of Mesoamerica; c. 33 000 BCE – c. 1521 CE) up to the colonial and postcolonial periods (c. 1521 CE – Present). This list includes any raid, strike, skirmish, siege, sacking, and/or battle (land, naval, and air) that occurred on the territories of what may today be referred to as Mexico (Mesoamerica, Aridoamerica, and Oasisamerica); however, in which the conflict itself may have only been part of an operation of a campaign in a theater of a greater war (e.g. any and/or all border, undeclared, colonial, proxy, liberation, global, Indian wars, etc.). There may also be periods of violent, civil unrest listed; such as, shootouts, spree killings, massacres, terrorist attacks, coups, assassinations, regicides, riots, rebellions, revolutions, and civil wars (as well as wars of succession and/or independence). The list might also contain episodes of human sacrifice, mass suicide, and ethnic cleansing/genocide.

== Pre-Columbian era (c. 33000 BCE – 1521 CE) ==
A map detailing the pre-Columbian distribution of the language families of indigenous North American peoples (including those of Northern Mexico).

A map detailing the approximated migration routes and dates for various Mayan language families. The region labeled under Proto-Mayan is now occupied by speakers of the branch of Qʼanjobalan languages (light blue in other figures).

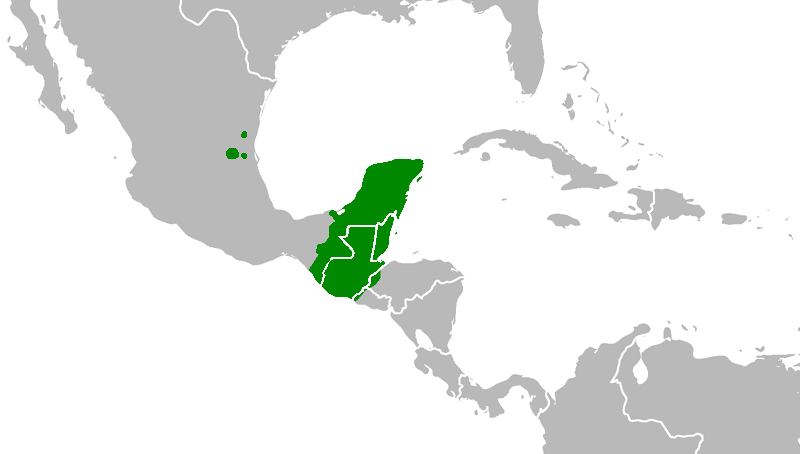
A map detailing the location and extent of Mayan-speaking populations.

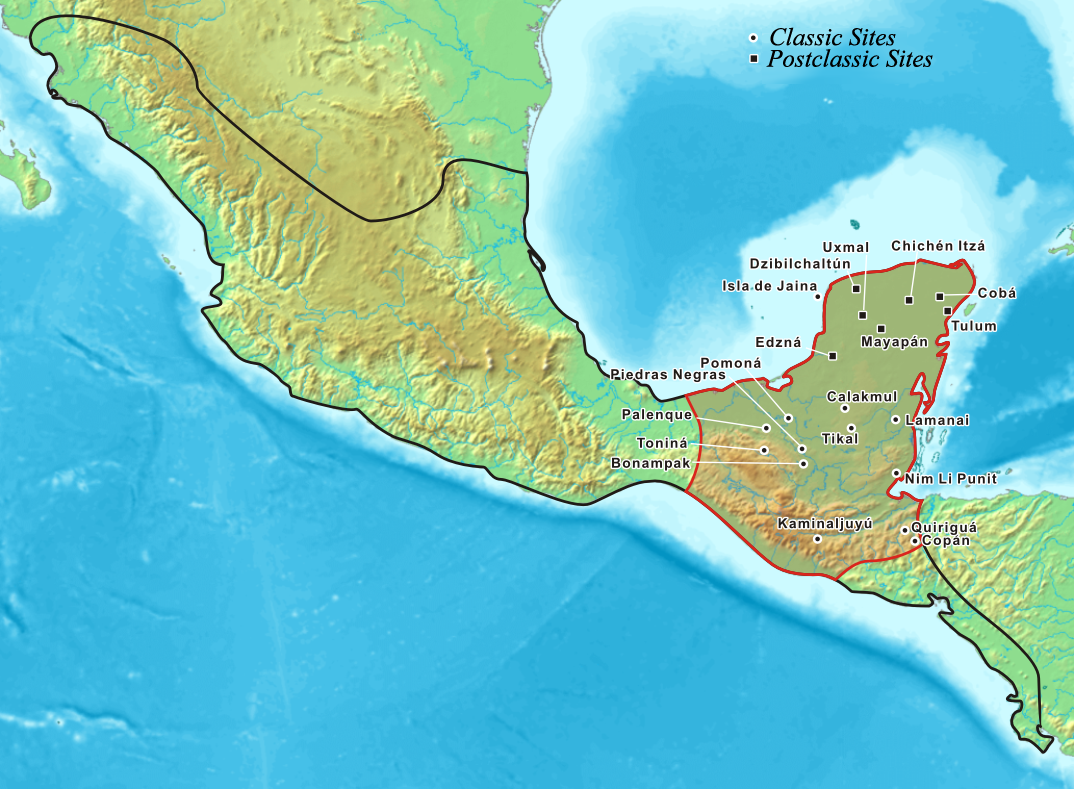
A map detailing the general area of the Mayan civilization and its city-states in the greater Mesoamerican region. The settlements of Calakmul (in Mexico) and Tikal (in Guatemala) both developed near the center of this civilization.

A map detailing the Valley of Mexico basin (c. 1519 CE).

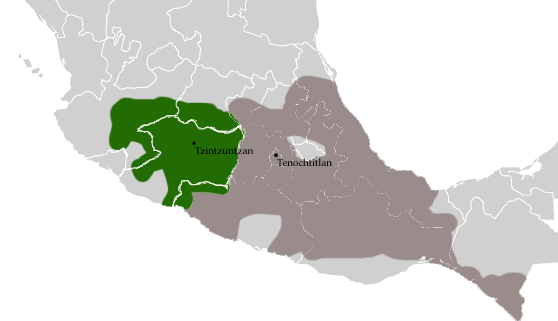
A map detailing the location and territorial extent of the Tarascan empire (in green).

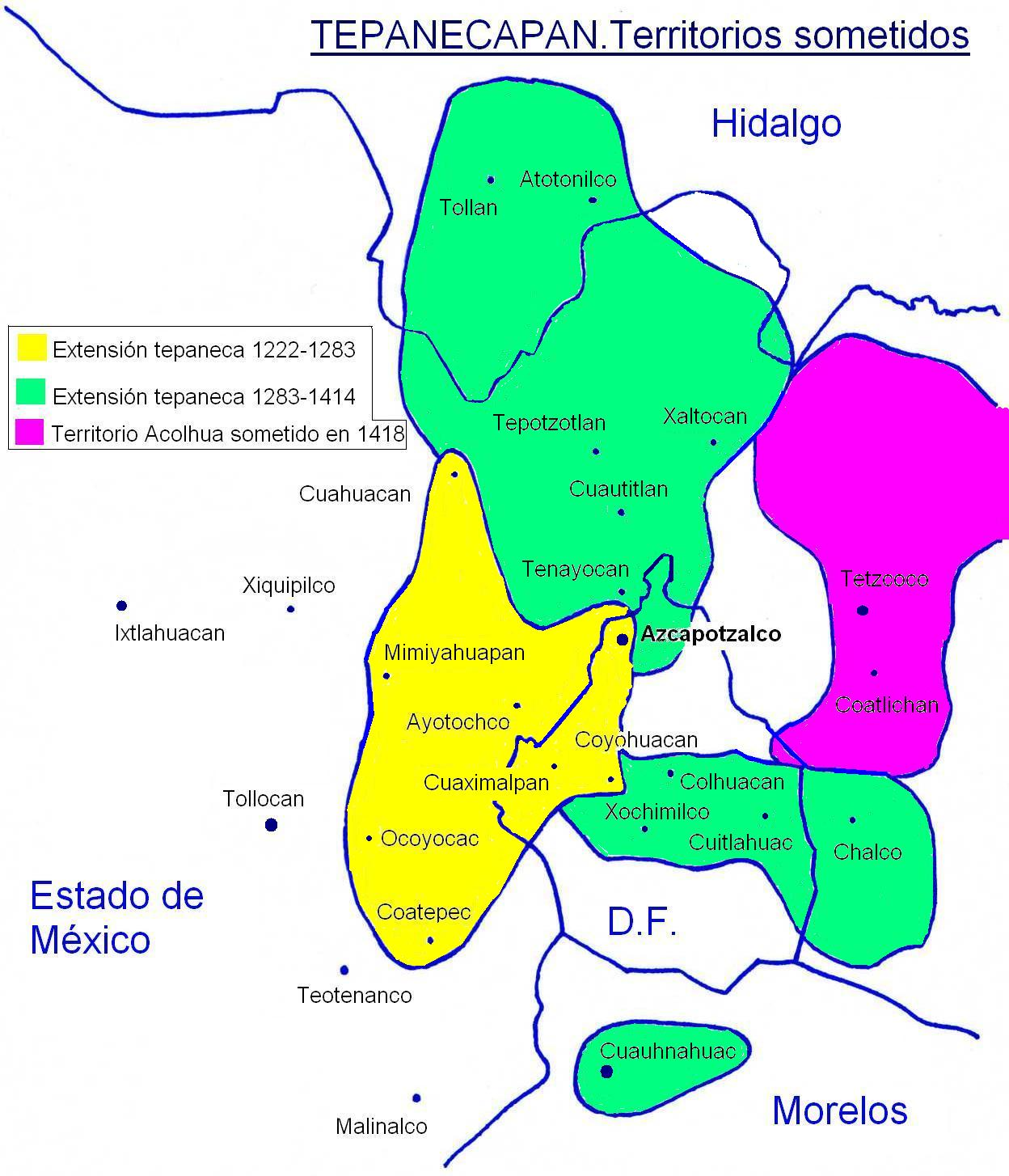
A map detailing the territorial extent of the Tepanec empire with their capital (Azcapotzalco) near the center: c. 1222 – c. 1283 CE c. 1283 – c. 1414 CE c. 1414 – c. 1431 CE

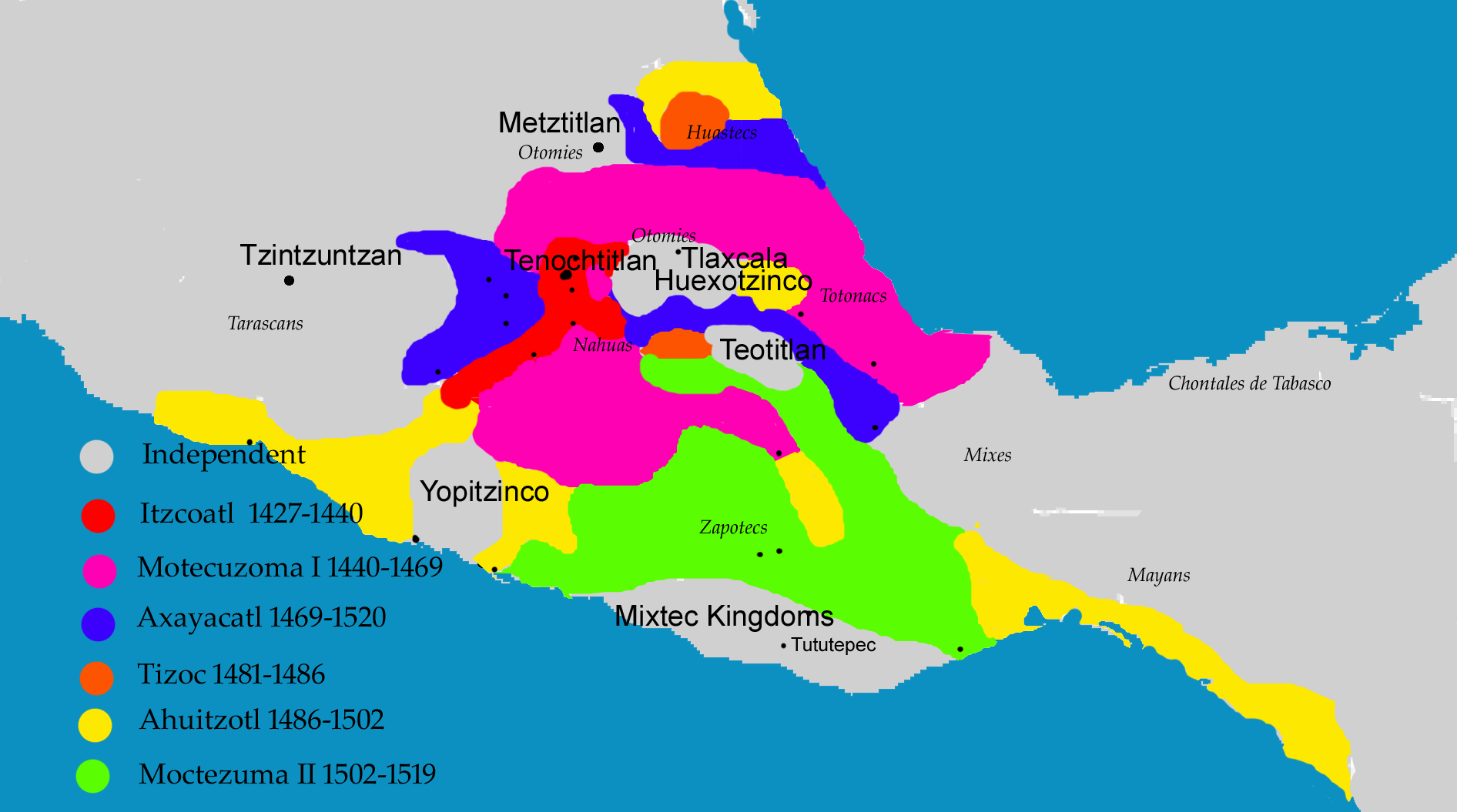
A map showing the expansion of the Aztec Empire, showing the areas conquered by the Aztec rulers.

A map showing the maximal, territorial extent of the Aztec Empire (according to María del Carmen Solanes Carraro and Enrique Vela Ramírez).

=== Preclassic stage (c. 2000 BCE – c. 250 CE) ===
==== Late Preclassic period (c. 350 BCE – c. 1 BCE) ====
===== Terminal Preclassic division (c. 159 – c. 250 CE) =====
====== Teotihuacan civilization (c. 100 BCE – c. 550 CE) ======
- Campaigns of Spearthrower Owl (r. c. 374 – c. 439 CE)
  - Conquest of Tikal (378 CE)
  - Conquest of Copán (426 CE)
  - Conquest of Quiriguá (426 CE)
- Fall of Teotihuacan (c. 500 – 550 CE)

====== Maya civilization (c. 1000 BCE – c. 1697 CE) ======
- Wars of the Mayans (c. 2000 BCE – 1697)
  - Campaigns of K'inich Tatb'u Skull I (reign: c. 402 – c. 454 CE)
    - Conquest of Bonampak
  - Campaigns of Yuknoom Chʼeen I (r. c. 484 – c. 520 CE)

=== Classic (c. 250 – c. 900 CE) ===
==== Early Classic period (c. 250 – c. 550 CE) ====
===== Maya civilization (c. 2000 BCE – 1697 CE) =====
- Wars of the Mayans (c. 2000 BCE – 1697 CE)
  - Campaigns of Tuun Kʼabʼ Hix (r. c. 520 – c. 546 CE)
  - Campaigns of Itzamnaaj Bahlam II (r. 570–610, 599–611 CE)
    - War against Ah Ahaual
  - Campaigns of Yohl Ikʼnal (r. 583–604 CE)
    - Palenque–Calakmul war (599–611 CE)
      - Sack of Palenque (599 CE)

==== Late Classic period (c. 550 – c. 830 CE) ====
===== Maya civilization (c. 2000 BCE – 1697 CE) =====
- Wars of the Mayans (c. 2000 BCE – 1697 CE)
  - Campaigns of Sky Witness (r. c. 561 – c. 572 CE)
    - Tikal–Calakmul wars (537–838 CE)
      - First Tikal–Calakmul War (537–572 CE)
    - Star wars (562–781 CE)
      - Tikal–Calakmul star war (562 CE)
  - Campaigns of Scroll Serpent (r. 579–611 CE)
    - Calakmul–Palenque war (599 CE)
  - Campaigns of Yuknoom Head (r. 630–636 CE)
    - Star wars (562–781 CE)
      - Calakmul–Naranjo star war (631 CE)
  - Campaigns of K'ahk' Xiiw Chan Chaahk (r. 644–680 CE)
    - Star wars (562–781 CE)
      - Naranjo–Caracol war (636 CE)
  - Campaigns of Bahlam Ajaw (r. 644–679 CE)
    - Star wars (562–781 CE)
      - Tortuguero star war (644 CE)
    - Conquest of Comalcalco (649 CE)
  - Campaigns of Yuknoom Chʼeen II (r. c. 600 – c. 686 CE)
    - Tikal–Calakmul wars (537–838 CE)
      - Second Tikal–Calakmul War (650–695 CE)
        - Defeat of Calakmul (695 CE)
    - Star wars (562–781 CE)
      - Tikal–Calakmul star war (657 CE)
  - Campaigns of Yaxun Bʼalam III (r. 631–681 CE)
    - Conquest of Hix Witz (c. 646 – c. 647 CE)
  - Campaigns of Itzamnaaj Bahlam III (r. 681–742 CE)
    - War against Ah Ahaual (c. 680 CE)
  - Campaigns of Kʼakʼ Tiliw Chan Chaak (r. 693 – c. 720 CE)
    - Defeat of Ucanal (695 CE)
    - Sack of Yaxha (710 CE)
  - Campaigns of K'inich B'aaknal Chaak (r. 688–715 CE)
    - Star wars (562–781 CE)
      - Tonina–Palenque war (711 CE)
  - Campaigns of Wak Chanil Ajaw (r. 693–706, 721–741 CE)
    - Sack of K'inichil Kab (699 CE)
    - Sacking of nine unknown polities (c. 699 – c. 726 CE)
    - Victory against Komkom (726 CE)
  - Campaigns of Yax Mayuy Chan Chaak (r. 741–744, 721–741 CE)
    - Conquest of Komkom (726 CE)
    - Defeat by Tikal (744 CE)
  - War of succession (c. 742 – c. 752 CE)
  - Campaigns of Yaxun Bʼalam IV (r. 752–768 CE)
  - Defeat of Yuknoom Tookʼ Kʼawiil (r. c. 702 – c. 731, c. 702 – c. 736 CE)
    - Tikal–Calakmul wars (537–838 CE)
      - Third Tikal–Calakmul War (720–744 CE)
        - Conquest of Calakmul (736 CE)

==== Terminal Classic period (c. 830 – c. 950 CE) ====
===== Maya civilization (c. 2000 BCE – 1697 CE) =====
- Wars of the Mayans (c. 2000 BCE – 1697 CE)
  - Classic Maya collapse (c. 763 – c. 1179 CE)

===== Toltec civilization (c. 950 CE – c. 1168 CE) =====
====== Toltec empire (c. 674 – c. 1122 CE) ======
- Campaigns of Xochitl (r. c. 877 – c. 916 CE)
  - Toltec civil war (c. 877 – c. 1110 CE)
- Campaigns of Ce Acatl Topiltzin (r. c. 923 – c. 931, c. 923 – c. 947 CE)
  - Toltec civil war (c. 877 – c. 1110 CE)

=== Postclassic (c. 900 – c. 1521 CE) ===
==== Early Postclassic period (c. 950 – c. 1200 CE) ====
===== Mixtec civilization (c. 1500 BCE – c. 1523 CE) =====
- Campaigns of Eight Deer Jaguar Claw (r. 1063–1115 CE)
  - Conquest of Red and White Bundle (c. 1099 CE)
  - Execution of Eight Deer Jaguar Claw (1115 CE)
- Campaigns of Atonal II (r. c. 1453 – c. 1458, c. 1453 – c. 1461, c. 1468, c. 1490 CE)
  - Defeated by the Aztecs (c. 1453, c. 1458, c. 1461, c. 1468, or c. 1490 CE)
    - Conquest of Coixtlahuaca (c. 1453, c. 1458, c. 1461, c. 1468, or c. 1490 CE)

===== Maya civilization (c. 2000 BCE – 1697 CE) =====
- Wars of the Mayans (c. 2000 BCE – 1697 CE)
  - Classic Maya collapse (c. 763 – c. 1179 CE)
  - Campaigns of Chac-Xib-Chac (r. c. 1175 – c. 1194 CE)
    - Conquest of Chichen Itza
  - Fall of Mayapan (c. 1440 – c. 1461 CE)

==== Late Postclassic period (c. 1200 – 1521 CE) ====
===== Purépecha civilization (c. 1300 – 1530 CE) =====
====== Purépecha empire (c. 1300 – 1530 CE) ======
- Campaigns of Tariácuri (r. c. 1350 CE)
- Campaigns of Tangaxuan II (r. 1520–1530 CE)
  - Saltpeter war (1480–1510 CE)

===== Zapotec civilization (c. 700 BCE – 1521 CE) =====
- Wars of the Zapotecs
  - Campaigns of Cosijoeza (r. 1487–1504 CE)
    - Zapotec conquest of Tehuantepec (1487 CE)
    - Zapotec warfare and resistance against the Aztecs (1496–1497 CE)
      - Aztec siege of Tehuantepec (1496 CE)
      - Aztec destruction of Huaxyacac (1497 CE)
      - Aztec destruction of Mitla (1497 CE)
      - Aztec siege of Guiengola (1497 CE)

===== Aztec civilization (c. 1325 – 1521 CE) =====
====== Tepanec empire (c. 995–1428 CE) ======
- Wars of the Tepanecs (c. 1222 – c. 1431 CE)
  - Conquest of Ayotoxco (c. 1222 – c. 1283 CE)
  - Conquest of Ocoyoacac (c. 1222 – c. 1283 CE)
  - Conquest of Coyoacán (c. 1222 – c. 1283 CE)
  - Conquest of Coatepec (c. 1222 – c. 1283 CE)
  - Conquest of Cuitláhuac (c. 1250 – c. 1414 CE)
  - Conquest of Cuauhtitlan (c. 1283 – c. 1343 CE)
  - Conquest of Azcapotzalco (c. 1283 – c. 1414 CE)
  - Conquest of Atotonilco (c. 1300 – c. 1414 CE)
  - Campaigns of Coxcoxtli (reign: c. 1281 – c. 1307, c. 1281 – c. 1350 CE)
    - Culhuacán-Mexica war (c. 1299 – c. 1325 CE)
  - Conquest of Coatlinchan (c. 1337 – c. 1418 CE)
  - Conquest of Tetzcoco (c. 1337 – c. 1418 CE)
  - Conquest of Cuajimalpa (1342 CE)
  - Conquest of Xochimilco (c. 1352 – c. 1376 CE)
  - Conquest of Chalco (c. 1354 – c. 1376 CE)
  - Conquest of Cuauhnahuac (c. 1365 – c. 1396 CE)
  - Campaigns of Tezozomoc (r. c. 1353 – 1426, c. 1370 – 1426 CE)
    - Azcapotzalco-Texcoco war (c. 1367 – c. 1428 CE)
    - Conquest of Tepotzotlán (1372 CE)
    - Conquest of Culhuacán (c. 1377 – c. 1428 CE)
    - Conquest of Xaltocan (c. 1395 CE)
  - Campaigns of Maxtla (r. c. 1426 – c. 1428 CE)
    - Rebellion in Azcapotzalco (c. 1426 CE)
    - Tepanec War (1426–1440 CE)
- Wars of the Aztecs (c. 1248 – c. 1521 CE)
  - Campaigns of Acamapichtli (r. c. 1350 – c. 1403, c. 1376 – c. 1395 CE)
    - Conquest of Chalco (c. 1376 – c. 1410 CE)
    - Conquest of Cuauhnahuac
    - Conquest of Xochimilco (c. 1376 – c. 1430 CE)
  - Campaigns of Huitzilihuitl (r. c. 1390 – c. 1415, c. 1403 – c. 1417 CE)
    - Conquest of Tollantzingo (c. 1390 – c. 1417 CE)
    - Conquest of Otompa (c. 1395 – c. 1417 CE)
    - Conquest of Acolman (1396 CE)
    - Conquest of Tultitlan (c. 1396 – c. 1417 CE)
    - Conquest of Xaltocan (c. 1428 – c. 1495 CE)

====== Aztec Empire (1428–1521 CE) ======
- Wars of the Aztecs (1325 – 1521 CE)
  - Tepanec War (1426–1440 CE)
  - Conquest of Teotihuacan (1427 CE)
  - Campaigns of Itzcoatl (r. c. 1427 – c. 1440, c. 1428 – c. 1440 CE)
    - Conquest of Coyoacán (c. 1428 CE)
    - Conquest of Culhuacán (c. 1428 CE)
    - Conquest of Mixquic (1432 CE)
    - Conquest of Cuitláhuac (c. 1433 – c. 1434 CE)
    - Conquest of Tezompa (c. 1433 – c. 1434 CE)
    - Conquest of Cuauhnahuac (c. 1439 CE)
    - Conquest of Tenayuca (c. 1434 CE)
  - Campaigns of Moctezuma I (r. 1440–1466, 1440–1469 CE)
    - Subjugation of the Huastec people (c. 1445 – c. 1450 CE)
    - Subjugation of the Totonac people (c. 1445 – c. 1450 CE)
    - Flower wars (1454–1519 CE)
    - Subjugation of the Mixtec people (c. 1458 CE)
      - Conquest of Coixtlahuaca (c. 1458 CE)
    - Conquest of Cosamaloapan (c. 1458 – c. 1466 CE)
    - Conquest of Āhuilizāpan (c. 1458 – c. 1466 CE)
    - Conquest of Cuauhtitlan (c. 1458 – c. 1466 CE)
  - Campaigns of Axayacatl (r. c. 1469 – c. 1481, c. 1472 – c. 1481 CE)
    - Battle of Tlatelolco (1473 CE)
      - Conquest of Tlatelolco (1473 CE)
    - Conquest of Cuetlachtlan (1474 CE)
    - Subjugation of the Matlatzinca people (c. 1474 – c. 1478 CE)
      - Conquest of Calixtlahuaca (c. 1476 CE)
      - Conquest of Tollocan (1478 CE)
  - Campaigns of Moctezuma II (r. c. 1502 – 1520, c. 1503 – 1520 CE)
    - Conquest of Soconusco (c. 1486 – c. 1502 CE)
    - Conquest of Tehuantepec (c. 1496 – c. 1502 CE)
    - Subjugation of the Zapotec people (c. 1497 – c. 1502 CE)
    - Subjugation of the Yopi people (c. 1502 CE)

== Colonial period (1521–1821) ==
A map depicting Cortés' invasion route from the Gulf Coast of Mexico to the Aztec capital (Tenochtitlan).

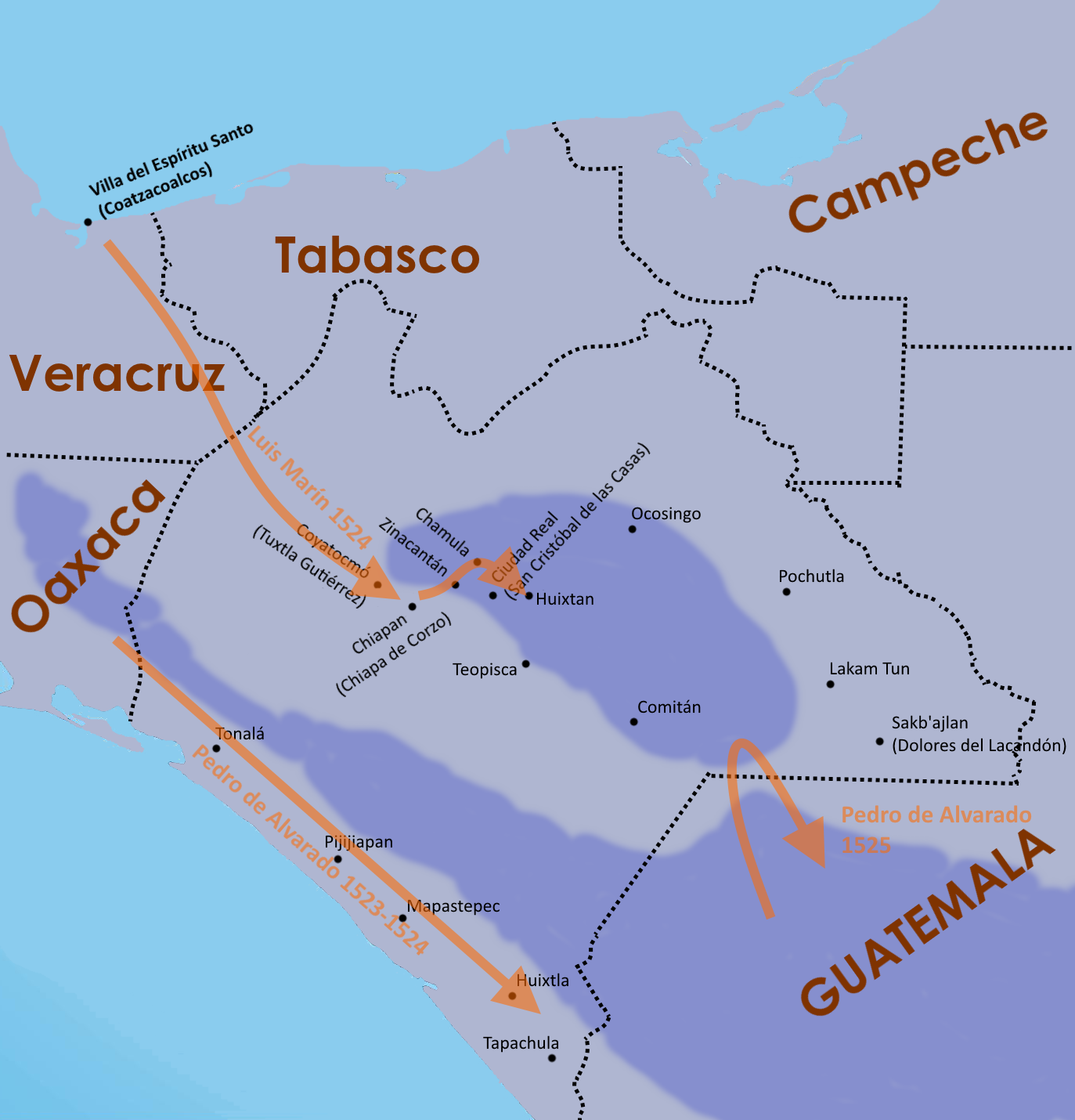
A map detailing the early entry routes of conquistadores such as Pedro de Alvarado and Luis Marín into Chiapas (c. 1523 – c. 1525). Highland regions are shaded.

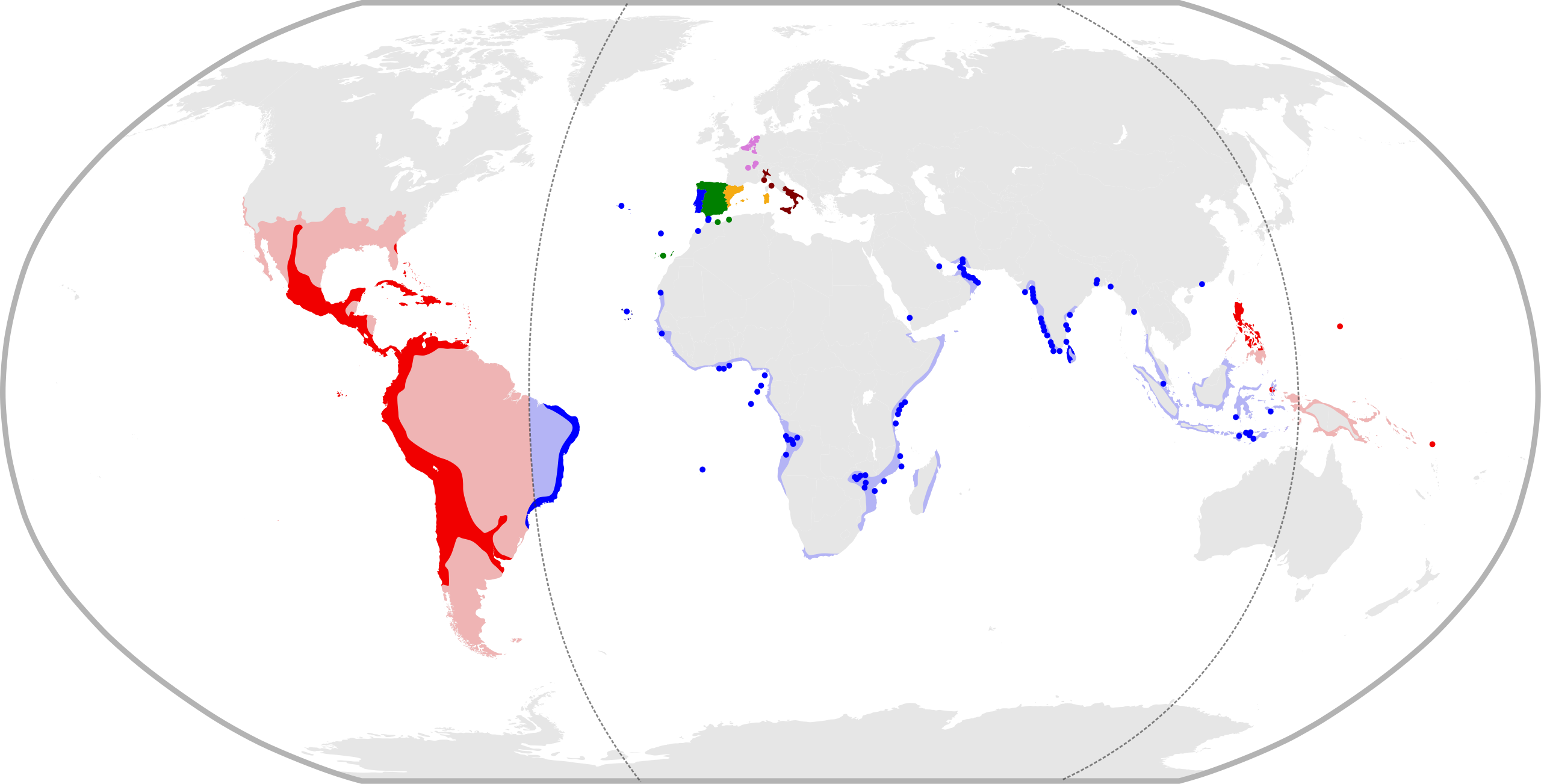
A map detailing the territorial extent of the realms of the king of Spain by the name of Philip the Prudent (r. 1556–1598, 1580–1598) as appointed to and administered by: Council of Castile Council of Aragon Council of Portugal Council of Italy Council of the Indies Council of Flanders

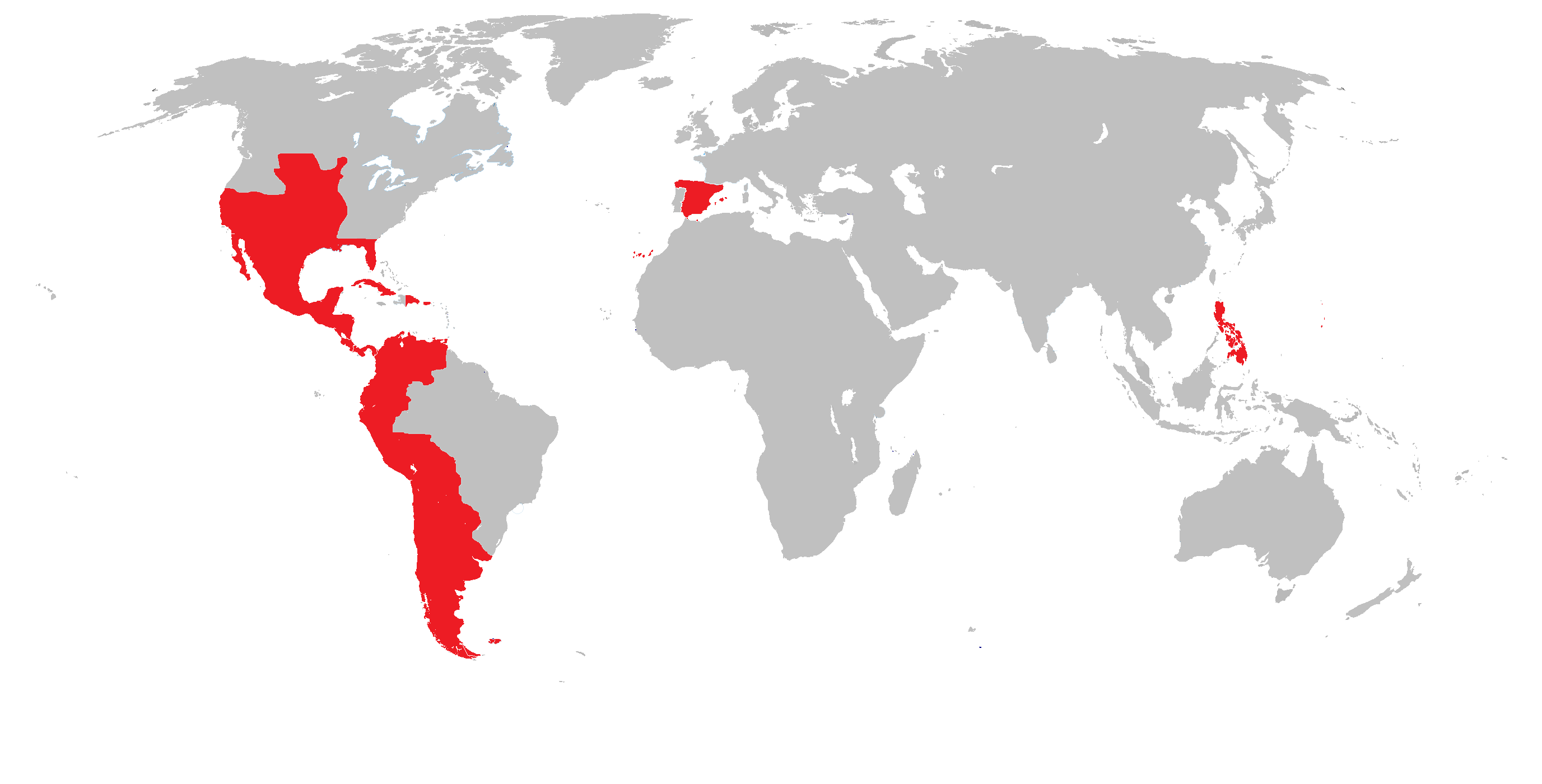
A map detailing the maximum territorial extent of the Spanish Empire (c. 1714 – c. 1800).

An animated map detailing the territorial evolution of non-native North American nation-states (c. 1750 – c. 2008).

Government under traditional Spanish law Loyal to Supreme Central Junta or Cortes American junta or insurrection movement Independent state declared or established Height of French control of the Peninsula

=== Spanish Golden Age (1492–1681) ===
==== Trastámaran dynasty (1479–1555) ====
===== Spanish conquest era (1521–1550) =====
- European colonization of the Americas (c. 1003 – c. 1945)
  - Spanish colonization of the Americas (c. 1492 – c. 1898)
    - Spanish conquest of Mexico (c. 1521 – c. 1550)
      - Spanish conquest of the Maya (c. 1521 – c. 1704)
        - Spanish conquest of Yucatán (c. 1521 – 1546)
        - Spanish conquest of Chiapas (c. 1523 – c. 1695)
      - Spanish conquest of the Aztec Empire (1519–1521)
        - Cholula massacre (1519)
        - Massacre in the Great Temple of Tenochtitlan (1520)
        - Battle of Cempoala (1520)
        - La Noche Triste (1520)
        - Battle of Otumba (1520)
        - Fall of Tenochtitlan (1521)
          - Battle of Colhuacatonco (1521)
      - Spanish conquest of the Tarascan empire (1522–1530)
      - Expedition of Francisco Vázquez de Coronado (1535–1554)
        - Conquest of Cíbola (1540)
        - Tiguex War (1540–1541)
      - Yaqui Wars (1533–1929)
      - Mixtón War (1540–1542)
      - Apache Wars (c. 1541 – 1924)
        - Apache–Mexico Wars (c. 1541 – 1915)
      - Chichimeca War (1550–1590)

==== Habsburg dynasty (1555–1700) ====
===== Pax Hispanica (1598–1621) =====
- European colonization of the Americas (c. 1003 – c. 1945)
  - Spanish colonization of the Americas (c. 1492 – c. 1898)
    - Spanish conquest of Mexico (c. 1502 – c. 1550)
      - Spanish conquest of the Maya (c. 1502 – c. 1704)
        - Spanish conquest of Chiapas (c. 1523 – c. 1695)
        - Spanish conquest of Petén (c. 1618 – c. 1697)
      - Yaqui Wars (1533–1929)
      - Apache Wars (c. 1541 – 1924)
        - Apache–Mexico Wars (c. 1541 – 1924)
      - Chichimeca war (1550–1590)
      - Acoma massacre (1599)
      - Acaxee Rebellion (1601–1607)
      - Tepehuán Revolt (1616–1620)
      - Navajo Wars (c. 1641 – 1864)
- European wars of religion (c. 1522 – c. 1714)
  - Eighty Years' War (1568–1648)
    - Anglo-Spanish war (1585–1604)
      - Raid on Tabasco (1599)

=== Bourbon dynasty (1700–1808) ===
- European colonization of the Americas (c. 1003 – c. 1945)
  - Spanish colonization of the Americas (c. 1492 – c. 1898)
    - Spanish conquest of Mexico (c. 1502 – c. 1550)
      - Spanish conquest of the Maya (c. 1502 – c. 1704)
      - Apache wars (c. 1541 – 1924)
        - Apache–Mexico wars (c. 1541 – 1924)
          - First Magdalena Massacre (1757)
          - Second Magdalena massacre (1776)
      - Navajo wars (c. 1641 – 1864)
      - Tzeltal rebellion (1712)

== Postcolonial period (1821 – present) ==
=== Mexican independence era (1808–1829) ===
==== House of Bonaparte (1808–1813) ====
A map detailing towns along the route of the campaign of Miguel Hidalgo y Costilla during the Mexican War of Independence.

A map detailing the campaigns of José María Morelos during the Mexican War of Independence.

- Spanish American wars of independence (1808–1833)
  - Mexican War of Independence (1810–1821)
    - First stage (1810–1811)
      - Battle of Monte de las Cruces (1810)
      - Battle of Calderón Bridge (1811)
    - Organizational phase (1810–1815)
      - Battle of El Veladero (1810–1811)
      - Battle of Puerto de Piñones (1811)
      - Battle of Zacatecas (1811)
      - Battle of El Maguey (1811)
      - Battle of Llanos de Santa Juana (1811)
      - Battle of Zitácuaro (1812)
      - Battle of Tecualoya (1812)
      - Battle of Tenancingo (1812)
      - Siege of Cuautla (1812)
      - Battle of Izúcar (1812)
      - Siege of Huajuapan de León (1812)
      - Battle of Tenango del Valle (1812)
      - Battle of Escamela (1812)
      - Battle of Zitlala (1812)
      - Capture of Orizaba (1812)
      - Capture of Oaxaca (1812)

==== House of Bourbon (1813–1820) ====
- Spanish American wars of independence (1808–1833)
  - Mexican War of Independence (1810–1821)
    - Organizational phase (1811–1815)
      - Battle of Rosillo Creek (1813)
      - Siege of Acapulco (1813)
      - Battle of La Chincúa (1813)
      - Battle of Alazan Creek (1813)
      - Battle of Medina (1813)
      - Battle of Lomas de Santa María (1813)
      - Battle of Puruarán (1814)
      - Battle of Temalaca (1815)
    - Resistance and consummation phases (1815–1821)
      - Battle of Agua Zarca (1819)

==== House of Iturbide (1821–1823) ====
===== First Mexican Empire (1821–1823) =====
A map detailing the territories of Northern America declared to belong to the First Mexican Empire (c. 1821). Northern border from the later Adams–Onís Treaty.

- Spanish American wars of independence (1808–1833)
  - Mexican War of Independence (1810–1821)
    - Resistance and consummation phases (1815–1821)
      - Battle of Azcapotzalco (1821)

====== Revolt against the emperor (1822–1823) ======
- Casa Mata Plan Revolution (1822–1823)
  - Battle of Almolonga (1823)

=== First Mexican Republic (1824–1835) ===
==== Provisional Government of Mexico (1823–1824) ====
A map detailing the territorial organization of the Provisional Government of Mexico (1823).

===== Spaniards in Mexico (1821–1829) =====
- Spanish attempts to reconquer Mexico (1821–1829)
  - Battle of Mariel (1828)

===== Revolts against the government (1823) =====
- Rebellion of Oaxaca (1823)
- Rebellion of Guadalajara (1823)
- Rebellion of Puebla (1823)
- Revolt of Querétaro (1823)

==== Age of Santa Anna (1829–1846) ====
An animated map detailing the territorial evolution of Mexico from 1824 to 1974.

- Spanish attempts to reconquer Mexico (1821–1829)
  - Battle of Tampico (1829–1829)

===== Centralist Republic of Mexico (1835–1846) =====
====== Comanche conflict (1821–1846) ======
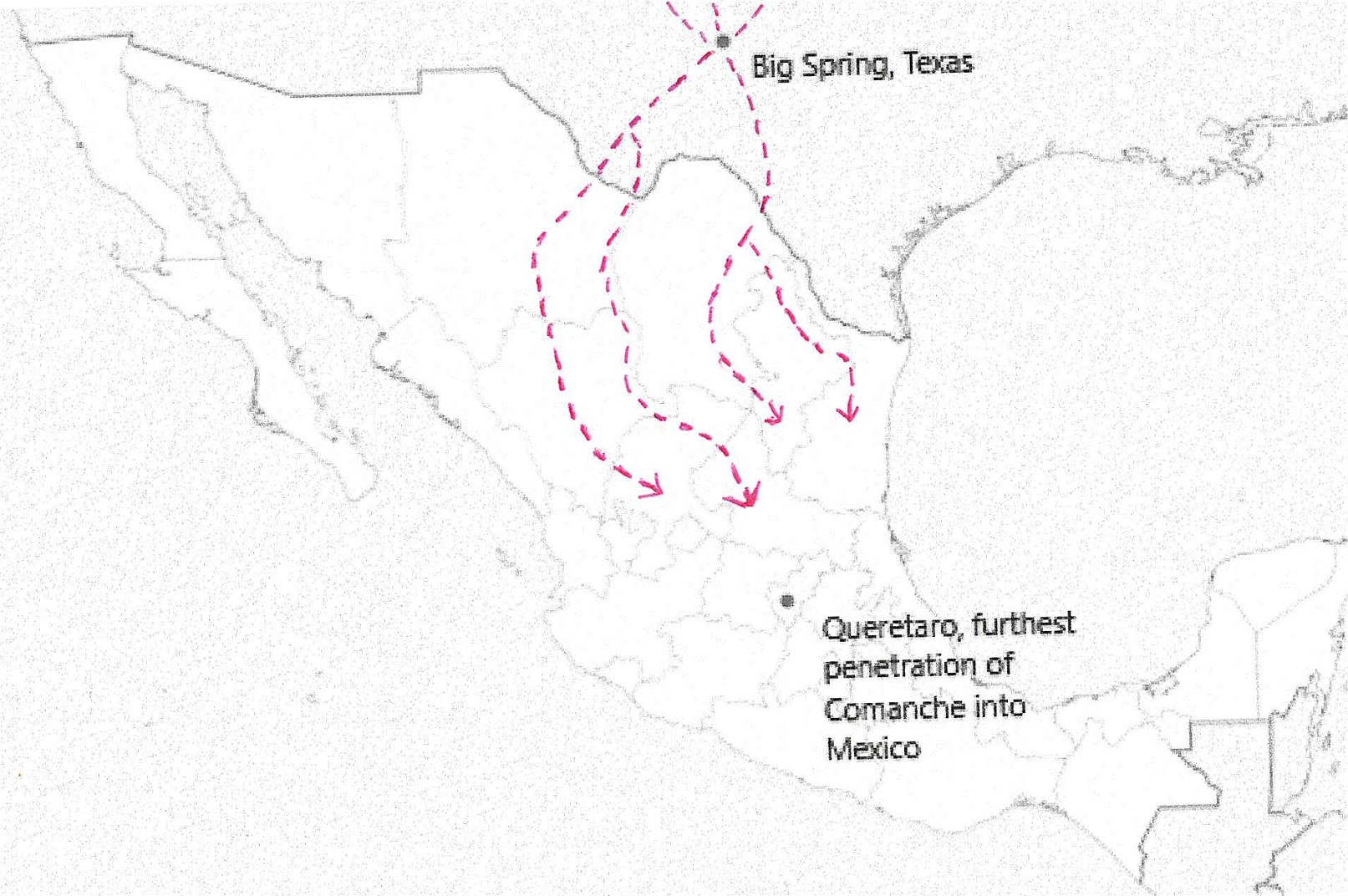
A map displaying the routes of Comanche raiders starting from Comancheria (near or all around Big Spring, Texas) and reaching as far south as Querétaro (1,400 kilometres away).

- Comanche-Mexico Wars (1821–1870)

====== Armed opposition (1835–1840) ======
The Centralist Republic with the separatist movements generated by the dissolution of the Federal Republic. The revolt in Las Californias (top far left, orange) was in 1836. Area in rebellion Area claimed by the Republics of Texas and the Rio Grande Area not in rebellion

- Mexican Federalist War (1835–1840)
  - Zacatecas rebellion (1835)
    - Battle of Zacatecas (1835)

====== Texas war for independence (1835–1836) ======
- Mexican Federalist War (1835–1840)
  - Mexican conflicts with Texas (1835–1836)
    - Texas Revolution (1835–1836)
      - Battle of Gonzales (1835)
      - Battle of Goliad (1835)
      - Battle of Concepción (1835)
      - Grass Fight (1835)
      - Siege of Béxar (1835)
      - Battle of San Patricio (1836)
      - Battle of the Alamo (1836)
      - Battle of Agua Dulce (1836)
      - Battle of Refugio (1836)
      - Battle of Coleto (1836)
      - Battle of San Jacinto (1836)
      - Battle of Matamoros (1836)
      - Battle of Salado Creek (1842)
    - Texan Santa Fe Expedition (1841–1842)
  - Battle of Acajete (1839)
  - Siege of Tampico (1839)
  - Battle of Alcantra (1839)
    - Rebellion of the Republic of the Rio Grande
      - Battle of Santa Rita de Morelos (1840)
      - Battle of Saltillo (1840)
- First Franco-Mexican War (1838–1839)
  - Battle of Veracruz (1838)
- Mier expedition (1842–1843)
- Naval Battle of Campeche (1843–1843)

====== Mexican–American War (1846) ======
- Mexican–American War (1846–1848)
  - Northern Mexican Theater (1846–1848)
    - Battle of Monterrey (1846)
  - Mexico City Campaign (1846–1848)
    - Blockade of Veracruz (1846–1848)

=== Second Federal Republic of Mexico (1846–1863) ===
==== Mexican–American War (1846–1848) ====
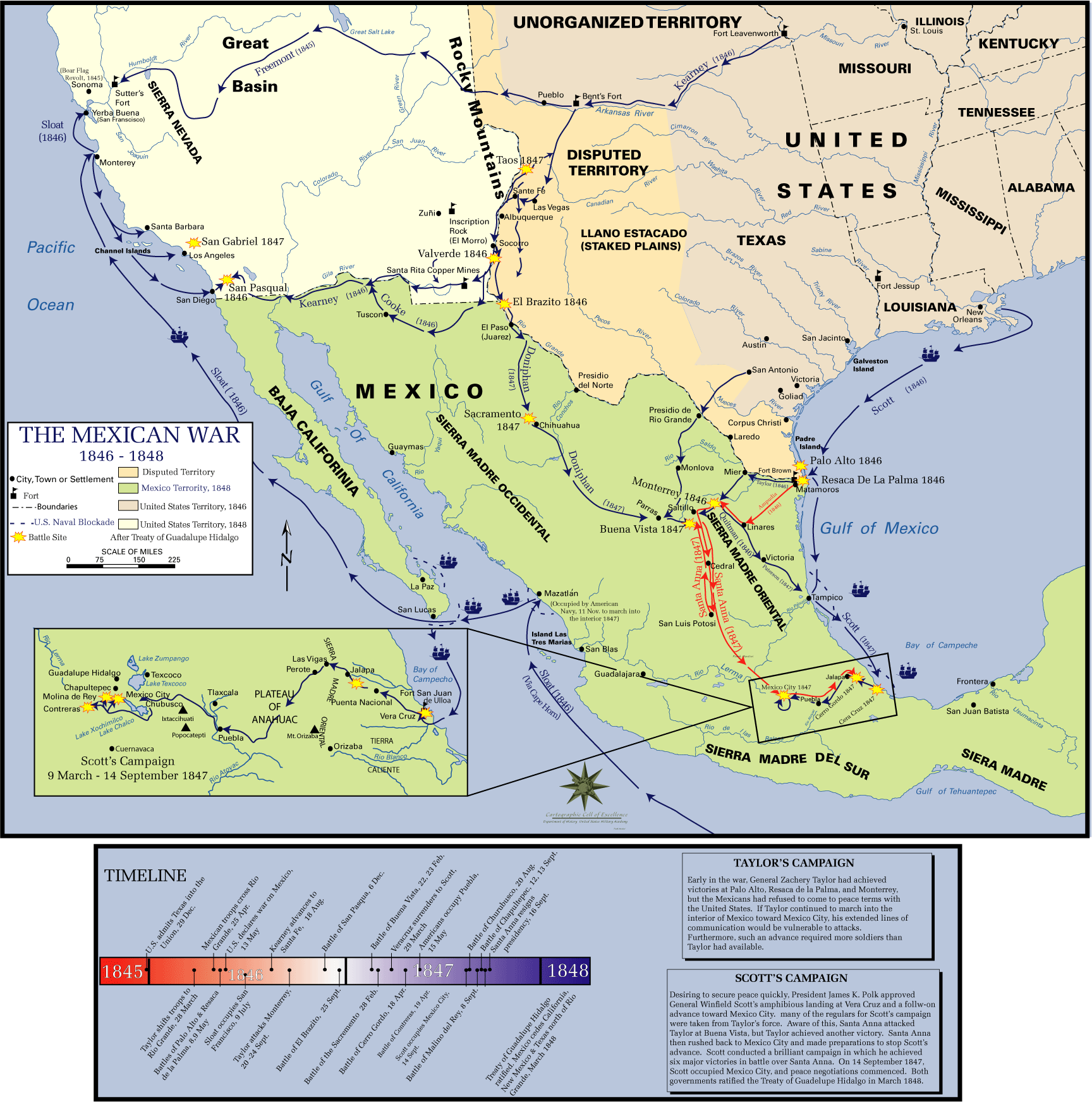
An overview map of the Mexican–American War including engagements of the Pacific Coast campaign.

- Mexican–American War (1846–1848)
  - Northern Mexican Theater (1846–1848)
    - Battle of Buena Vista (1847)
    - Battle of the Sacramento River (1847)
    - Battle of Santa Cruz de Rosales (1848)
  - Mexico City Campaign (1846–1848)
    - Blockade of Veracruz (1846–1848)
    - Revolt of the Polkos (1847)
    - Siege of Veracruz (1847)
    - Battle of Cerro Gordo (1847)
    - Battle of Contreras (1847)
    - Battle of Churubusco (1847)
    - Battle for Mexico City (1847)
      - Battle of Molino del Rey (1847)
      - Battle of Chapultepec (1847)
    - Siege of Puebla (1847)
    - Battle of Huamantla (1847)
    - Action of Atlixco (1847)
    - Skirmish at Matamoros (1847)
    - Affair at Galaxara Pass (1847)
    - Action of Sequalteplan (1848)
  - Pacific Coast Campaign (1847–1848)
    - Battle of Mulegé (1847)
    - Bombardment of Guaymas (1847)
    - Bombardment of Punta Sombrero (1847)
    - Battle of La Paz (1847)
    - Battle of San José del Cabo (1847)
    - Siege of La Paz (1847)
    - Siege of San José del Cabo (1848)
    - Skirmish of Todos Santos (1848)

==== La Reforma (c. 1833 – c. 1867) ====
- Zacatecas rebellion (1835)
- Caste War of Yucatán (1847 – c. 1933)

==== Santa Anna dictatorship (1853–1855) ====
- Expedition of William Walker to Baja California and Sonora (1853–1854)

==== Alvarez Presidency (1855) ====
- Revolution of Ayutla (1854–1855)

==== Juarez Presidency (1857–1872) ====
- Cortina Troubles (1859–1861)
  - Battle of La Ebonal (1859)
  - Battle of Rio Grande City (1859)

===== Reform War (1857–1860) =====
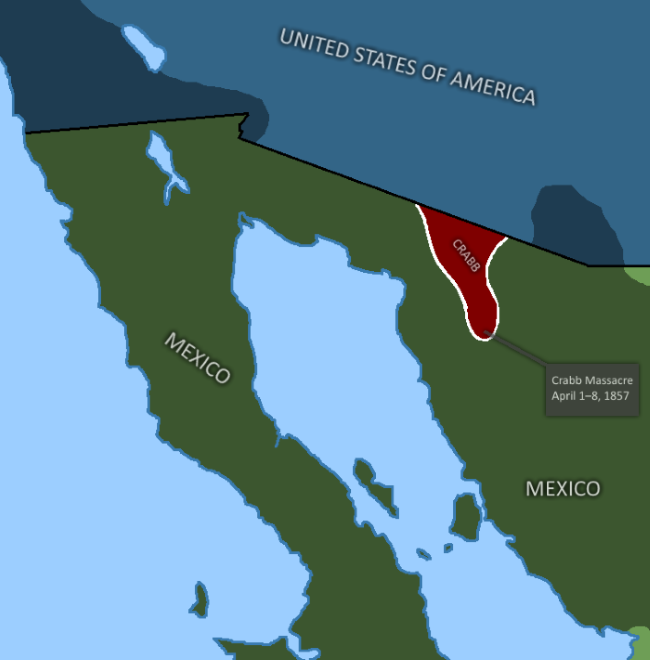
A map of Mexico showing the location of the Crabb massacre.

- Mexican Civil Wars (c. 1857 – Present)
  - Reform War (1857–1860)
    - Crabb massacre (1857)
    - Battle of Celaya (1858)
    - Battle of Salamanca (1858)
    - Battle of Atenquique (1858)
    - Battle of La Albarrada (1858)
    - Battle of Ixtlahuaca (1858)
    - Battle of Ahualulco (1858)
    - Battle of Guadalajara (1858)
    - Battle of San Joaquín (1858)

===== Foreign intervention (1861–1863) =====
- Second Franco-Mexican War (1861–1867)
  - Battle of Fortín (1862)
  - Battle of Las Cumbres (1862)
  - Battle of Atlixco (1862)
  - Battle of Puebla (1862)
  - Battle of Acapulco (1863)

=== Second Mexican Empire (1864–1867) ===
- Second Franco-Mexican War (1861–1867)
  - Battle of San Juan Bautista (1864)
  - Capture of Mazatlán (1864)
  - Capture of Monterrey (1864)
  - Battle of San Pedro (1864)
  - Battle of la Loma (1865)
  - Capture of Chihuahua (1865)
  - Battle of Miahuatlán (1866)
  - Battle of La Carbonera (1866)
  - Battle of Guayabo (1866)
  - Third Battle of Puebla (1867)
  - Siege of Querétaro (1867)
  - Siege of Mexico City (1867)

=== Restored Republic (1867–1876) ===
- Las Cuevas War (1875)
- Battle of Tecoac (1876)

=== Contemporary Mexico (1876 – Present) ===
==== Porfiriato (1876–1911) ====
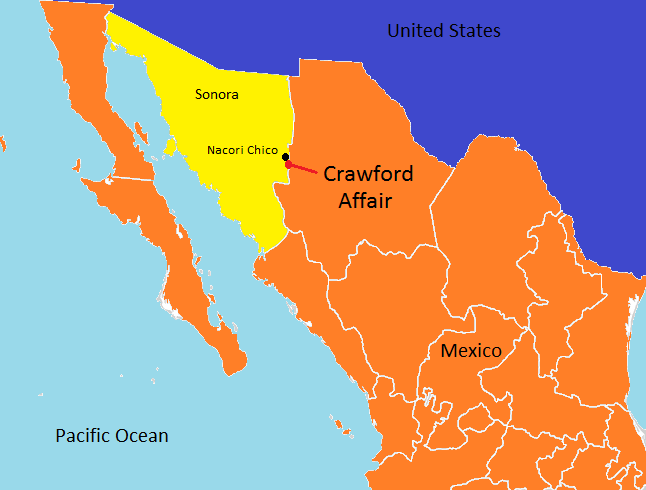
A map showing the location of the Crawford affair (in 1886) during the Geronimo campaign.

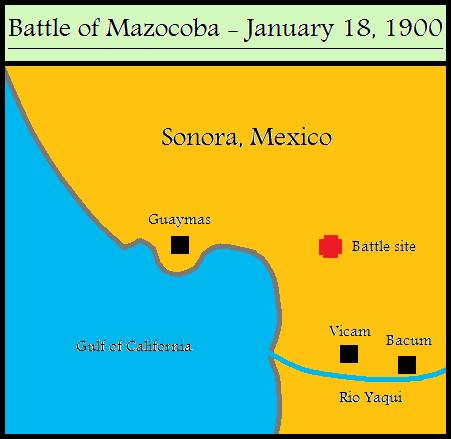
A map of Sonora showing the location of the Battle of Mazocoba near Guaymas on (in 1900) between the Mexican Army and Yaqui.

- Spanish colonization of the Americas (c. 1492 – c. 1898 CE)
  - Mexican-Indian Wars (c. 1533 CE – Present)
    - Yaqui Wars (1533–1929)
      - Yaqui Uprising (1896)
      - Battle of Mazocoba (1900)
    - Apache Wars (c. 1541 – 1924 CE)
      - Apache–Mexico Wars (c. 1541 – 1924)
        - Post-1887 Apache Wars period (1887–1924)
          - Apache campaign (1896)
    - Victorio's War (1879–1880)
    - Geronimo's War (1886–1887)
      - Crawford affair (1886)
- Garza Revolution (1891–1893)

==== Revolutionary Mexico (1911–1928) ====
===== Madero presidency (1911–1913) =====
A map detailing principal battles during the fight to oust Porfirio Díaz (1910–1911). Most action was in the northern border area, with the Battle of Ciudad Juárez being a decisive blow, but the struggle in Morelos by the Zapatistas was also extremely important, since the state was just south of the Mexican capital.

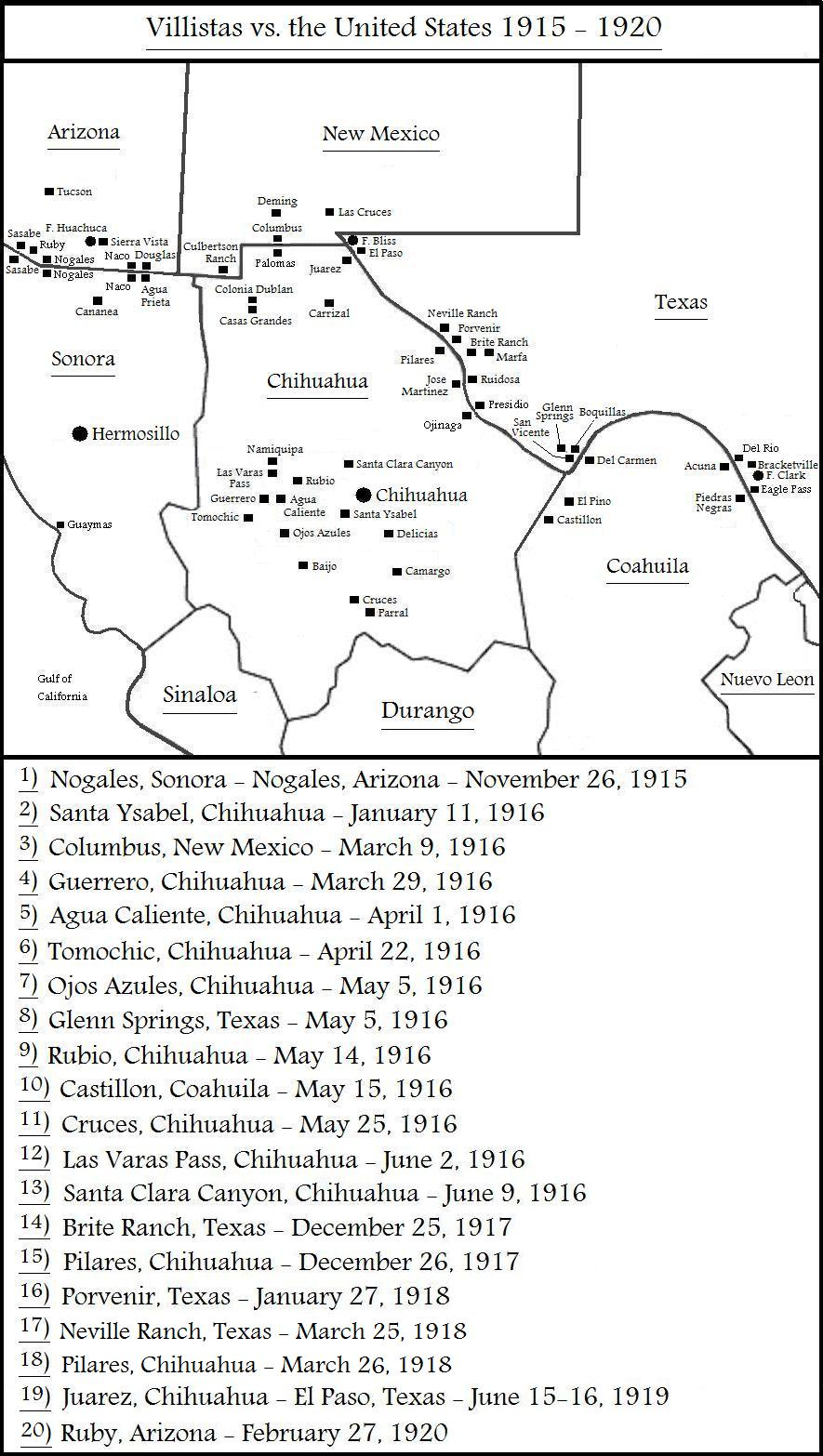
A map detailing the various battles between the Villistas and United States Armed Forces (1915–1920).

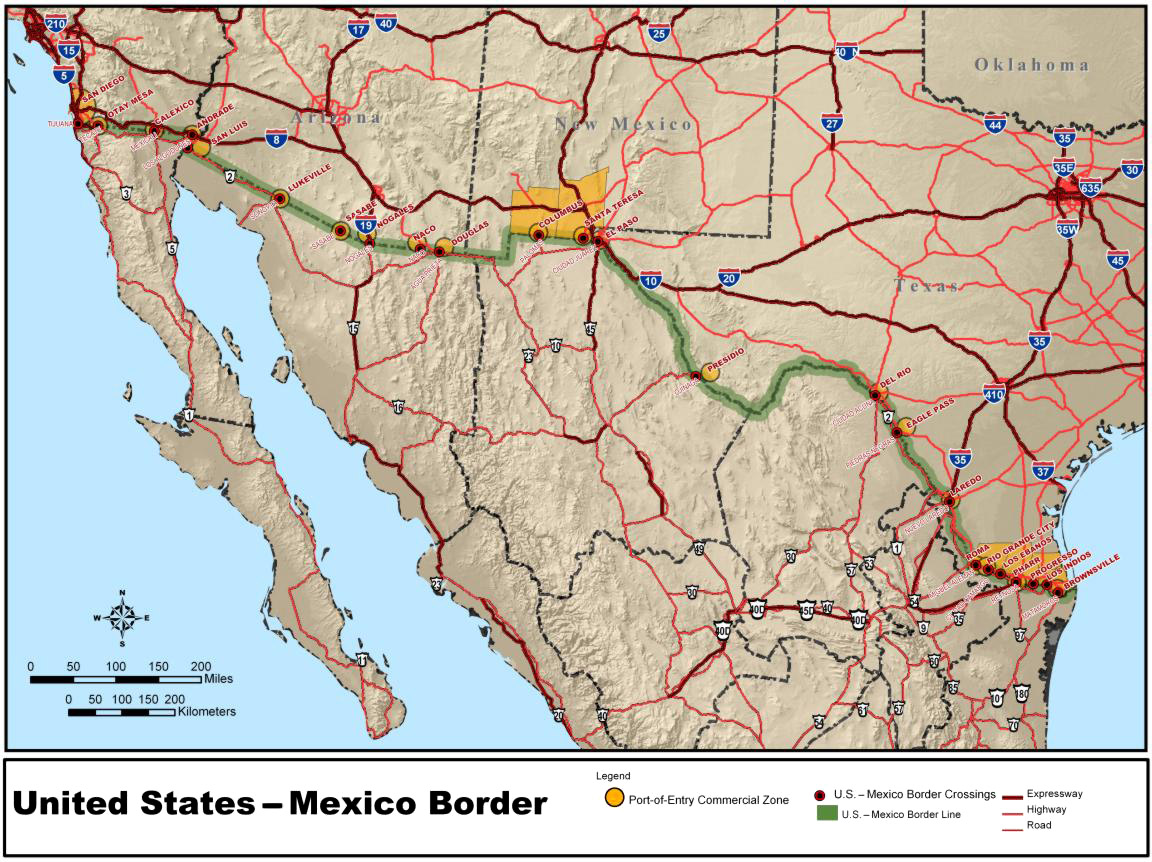
A map detailing the Mexico–United States border. The border spans four U.S. states, six Mexican states, and has over twenty commercial crossings.

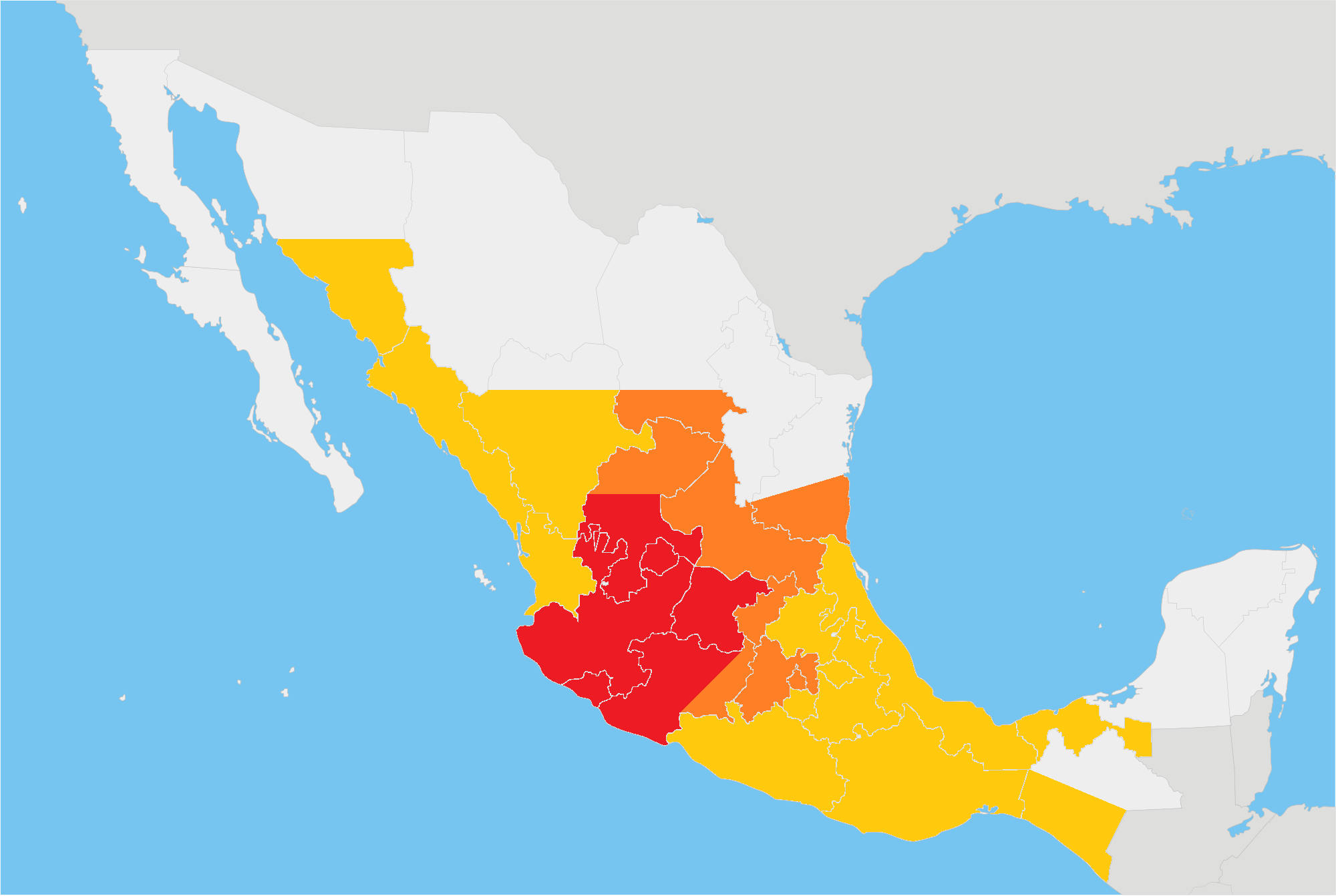
A map of Mexico showing conflict zones of the Cristero War and regions in which outbreaks occurred Large-scale outbreaks Moderate outbreaks Sporadic outbreaks

- Mexican Revolution (1910–1921)
  - Magonista campaign in Baja California (1911)
    - Capture of Mexicali (1911)
    - First Battle of Tijuana (1911)
    - Second Battle of Tijuana (1911)
  - Battle of Casas Grandes (1911)
  - First Battle of Agua Prieta (1911)
  - Battle of Cuautla (1911)
  - First Battle of Rellano (1912)
  - Second Battle of Rellano (1912)

===== Counter-revolution and civil war (1913–1915) =====
- Mexican Revolution (1910–1921)
  - Naval operations of the Mexican Revolution (1914)
    - First Battle of Topolobampo (1914)
    - Second Battle of Topolobampo (1914)
    - Third Battle of Topolobampo (1914)
    - Action of 9 April 1914
    - Fourth Battle of Topolobampo (1914)
  - Ten Tragic Days (1913)
  - First Battle of Nogales (1913)
  - Battle of Naco (1913)
  - First Battle of Torreón (1913)
  - Second Battle of Ciudad Juárez (1913)
  - Battle of Tierra Blanca (1913)
  - Battle of Ojinaga (1914)
  - Second Battle of Torreón (1914)
  - Battle of Zacatecas (1914)

===== Constitutionalists in power (1915–1920) =====
- Mexican Revolution (1910–1921)
  - Battle of Celaya (1915)
  - Second Battle of Agua Prieta (1915)
  - Third Battle of Torreón (1916)
  - Third Battle of Ciudad Juarez (1919)
- First World War (1914–1918)
  - Banana Wars (1898–1934)
    - Mexican–American wars (c. 1845 – c. 1977)
      - Rio Grande border disputes (c. 1845 – c. 1977)
        - Río Rico (c. 1845 – c. 1977)
        - Chamizal dispute (c. 1848 – c. 1967)
        - Country Club Dispute (c. 1850 – c. 1927)
        - Ojinaga Cut (c. 1970)
      - United States involvement in the Mexican Revolution (1910–1919)
        - Tampico Affair (1914)
        - Ypiranga incident (1914)
        - Mexican Border War (1910–1919)
          - First Battle of Agua Prieta (1911)
          - First Battle of Ciudad Juárez (1911)
          - Second Battle of Nogales (1915)
          - United States occupation of Veracruz (1914)
          - Pancho Villa Expedition (1916–1917)
            - Battle of Parral (1916)
            - Battle of Carrizal (1916)
          - Zimmermann Telegram (1917)
          - Battle of Ambos Nogales (1918)

===== Calles presidency (1924–1928) =====
- Cristero War (1926–1929)
  - Battle of San Julián (1927)

==== Mexico under the PNR (1929–1988) ====
===== Mexico under the PNR (1929–1938) =====
- Cristero War (1926–1929)
  - Battle of Tepatitlán (1929)
- Escobar Rebellion (1929)
  - Siege of Naco (1929)
  - Bombing of Naco (1929)
  - Johnson's Ranch Raid (1929)

===== Mexico under the PRM (1938–1946) =====
- Saturnino Cedillo rebellion (1938–1939)

====== Camacho presidency (1940–1946) ======
- Second World War (1939–1945)
  - Sinking of SS Faja de Oro (1942)

===== Mexico under the PRI (1946–1988) =====
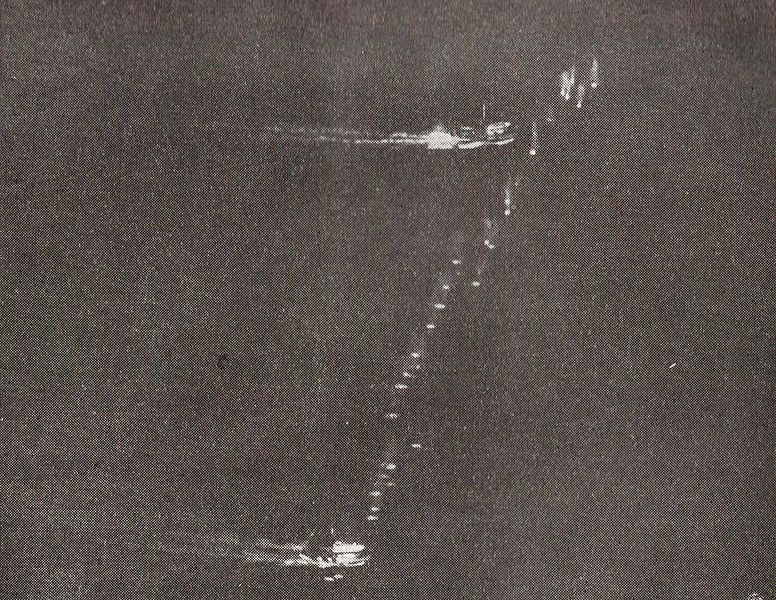
A photograph of a P-51 Mustang from the Guatemalan Air Force firing warning shots at a Mexican fishing vessel crossing the nautical border into Guatemala in 1958.

- Mexico–Guatemala conflict (1958–1959)
- Cold War (1947–1991)
  - Mexican Dirty War (1959–2000)
    - Protests of 1968 (1968–1969)
      - Mexican Movement (1968–1968)
        - Tlatelolco massacre (1968)
    - El Halconazo (1971)

==== Chiapas conflict (1994–2014) ====
- Chiapas conflict (1994–2014)
  - Zapatista Uprising (1994–2006)
    - Zapatista uprising (1994)
    - Zapatista crisis (1995)
    - The Other Campaign (2005–2006)
  - Acteal massacre (1997)

==== Mexican drug war (2006 – Present) ====
- War on drugs (1969 – Present)
  - Mexican drug war (2006 – Present)
    - Operation Michoacán (2006 – Present)
    - Operation Baja California (2007 – Present)
    - Joint Operation Nuevo León-Tamaulipas (2007 – Present)
      - Nuevo León mass graves (2010)
      - San Fernando massacre (2010)
      - Shootout at Matamoros (2010)
      - San Fernando massacre (2011)
      - Monterrey casino attack (2011)
    - Operation Sinaloa (2008 – Present)
    - Operation Chihuahua (2008 – Present)
    - Operation Quintana Roo (2009 – Present)
    - Coahuila mass graves (2011)
    - Operación Lince Norte (2011)
    - Operación Escorpión (2011)
- Mexican Indignados Movement (2011 – Present)
- Mexican protests (2017)
