= List of wars involving Mexico =

This is a list of wars involving various Mexican states.

Mexico has been involved in numerous different military conflicts over the years, with most being civil/internal wars.

== Pre-Hispanic Mexico ==
Conflict	Combatant 1	Combatant 2	Results
Spanish conquest of the Maya (1511–1697): Part of Spanish colonization of the Americas	Late Postclassic Maya states	Spanish Empire: Crown of Castile	Defeat
Spanish conquest of Tabasco (1518–1564): Part of Spanish colonization of the Americas	Chontal Maya	(Spain) Spanish Empire	Defeat
Spanish conquest of the Mexica (1519–1530): The Night of Sorrows; Fall of Tenochtitlan; Part of the Spanish colonization of the Americas and Mexican Indian Wars	(Aztec Empire) Mexica (1519–1521): Tenochtitlan; Cholula; Tlatelolco; Chalco; Xochimilco; Xaltocan; Tlacopan; Allied city-states: Teotitlan; Independent kingdoms and city-states: Confederacy of Tlaxcala (1519); Purépecha Empire (1522); Metztitlan; Tututepec (1522); Yopitzinco; Colliman (1523); Xalisco; Guamare Confederacy; Other Chichimecas; Tonallan; Various petty city-states and tribes (map); Governorate of Cuba (1520, see)	(Crown of Castile) Habsburg Spain: (Crown of Castile) Viceroyalty of the Indies (until 1521); (Crown of Castile) New Spain (from 1521); Indigenous allies: Confederacy of Tlaxcala; Tetzcoco; Totonacapan; Huejotzingo; Zaachila^{a}; Purépecha Empire (1522-1529, since 1533); Support or occasional allies^{b}: Otomi; Chalco; Xochimilco; Mixquic; Iztapalapa	Defeat: Annexation of the Mexica and others by the Spanish Empire; Creation of the Kingdom of New Spain

== Viceroyalty of New Spain ==
Conflict	Combatant 1	Combatant 2	Results
Spanish conquest of the Purepecha (1522–1530): Part of Spanish colonization of the Americas	Spain: New Spain; Indian auxiliaries	Purépecha Empire	Defeat: Incorporation of the territory into the Viceroyalty of New Spain
Spanish conquest of Chiapas (c. 1523 – c. 1695): Part of Spanish colonization of the Americas	Spain: New Spain; Indian auxiliaries	Zoque people Chiapaneca people, Independent Maya, including: Lakandon Chʼol people; Tojolabal people; Tzotzil people	Defeat: Incorporation of Chiapas into the Viceroyalty of New Spain and the Captaincy General of Guatemala.
Spanish conquest of Guatemala (1524–1667): Part of Spanish colonization of the Americas	Spain: New Spain; Indian auxiliaries	Independent indigenous kingdoms and city-states, including the: Chajoma; Chuj; Itza; Ixil; Kakchiquel; Kejache; Kʼicheʼ; Kowoj; Lakandon Chʼol; Mam; Manche Chʼol; Pipil; Poqomam; Qʼanjobʼal; Qʼeqchiʼ; Tzʼutujil; Xinca; Yalain	Defeat: Creation of the Captaincy General of Guatemala
Spanish conquest of El Salvador (1524–1539): Part of Spanish colonization of the Americas	Spain: New Spain; Indian auxiliaries	Indigenous peoples of El Salvador, including: Chʼortiʼ Maya people; Lenca people; Mangue people; Matagalpa people; Pipil people; Poqomam Maya people; Xinca people	Defeat
Spanish conquest of Honduras (1524– c. 1539): Part of Spanish colonization of the Americas	Spain: New Spain; Indian auxiliaries	Indigenous peoples of Honduras, including: Chorotega people; Ch'ol Maya people; Ch'orti' Maya people; Jicaque people; Lenca people; Pech people; Pipil people; Sumu people	Defeat
Expedition to Chesapeake Bay (1526)	Spain: New Spain	Hostile Natives African rebels Spanish mutineers	Defeat for Spain: San Miguel de Gualdape is abandoned.
Conquest of Yucatán (1527–1697): Part of Spanish colonization of the Americas	Spain: New Spain; Indian auxiliaries (Tutul-Xiu)	Mayan tribes	Defeat: Creation of Captaincy General of Yucatán.
Narváez expedition (1527–1536)	Spain: New Spain	Tocobaga Uzita Apalachee Timucua Autes	Inconclusive: Spanish troops lost the route after a hurricane and return by land to Mexico.
Yaqui Wars (1533–1929): Part of Mexican Indian Wars	New Spain Mexico (since 1821) United States (since 1896)	Yaqui	Stalemate
Expedition of Francisco Vázquez de Coronado (1535–1554)	New Spain Indian auxiliaries	Pueblo	Stalemate: Spanish withdrawal
Grijalva expedition to the Equatorial Pacific (1537–1542)	Spain: New Spain	Hostile Indigenous peoples Spanish mutineers	Inconclusive due to the loss of the ship in New Guinea.
New Spain Exploration of North America (1539–1543): Batte of Mabila; Battle of Mississippi	New Spain Indian auxiliaries (Portugal) Portuguese volunteers	Northern Utina Coosa chiefdom Tuskaloosa Chickasaw	Defeat for Spain
Tiguex War (1540–1541): Part of Mexican Indian Wars	New Spain	Tiwa Indians	Defeat
Mixtón War (1540–1542): Part of Mexican Indian Wars	New Spain	Caxcanes	Defeat
Chichimeca War (1550–1590): Part of Mexican Indian Wars	New Spain Indian auxiliaries (Tlaxcalteca, Caxcan, Otomí, Mexica, Purépecha)	Chichimeca Confederation: Zacatecos; Caxcanes; Guachichiles; Pames; Guamares	Victory
Guamares Rebellion (1563–1569)	New Spain	Guamares	Defeat
Spanish assault on French Florida (1565)	Spanish Empire: New Spain; (Spain) Spanish Florida	Kingdom of France: French Florida; Huguenots	Victory for Spain
Spanish conquest of the Philippines (1565–1575): Capture of Cebu; Conquest of Madja-as; Battle of Manila (1570); Battle of Bangkusay Channel; Siege of Cainta (August 1571); Battle of Manila (1574)	Spanish Empire: New Spain; Allied Visayan forces; Indian auxiliaries from Mexico (mostly Tlaxcalans)	Rajahnate of Maynila Macabebe Rajahnate of Tondo Rahjanate of Cebu	Victory: Establishment of the Captaincy General of the Philippines by Miguel López de Legazpi.
Spanish expeditions to the Solomon Islands and Vanuatu (1567–1606)	(Spain) Spanish Empire: (Spain) Peru; (Spain) Philippines	Hostile inhabitants of Polynesia	Stalemate: Failed colonization attempts due to disease and belligerence of the inhabitants, as well as war crimes by explorers that discouraged the enterprise.
Philippine revolts against Spain (1567–1872): Dagami revolt (1567); Tagalog Revolt (1574); Pampanga Revolt (1585); Tondo Conspiracy (1587); Dingras Revolt (1589); Cagayan Revolt (1589); Magalat revolt (1596); Igorot revolt (1601); Sangley Rebellion (1603); Caquenga's Revolt (1607); Irraya or Gaddang Revolt (1621); Tamblot uprising (1621-1622); Bankaw revolt (1621–1622); Itneg Revolt (1625–1627); Second Chinese Insurrection (1639–1640); Ladia Revolt (1643); Sumuroy Revolt (1649–1650); Maniago Revolt (1660–1661); Malong Revolt (1660–1661); Almazan Revolt (January 1661); Chinese Revolt (1662); Panay Revolt (1663); Zambal Revolt (1681–1683); Dagohoy Rebellion (1744–1829); Agrarian Revolt (1745); Silang Revolt (1762–1763); Palaris Revolt (1762–1765); Basi Revolt (1807)	Spain: New Spain; (Spain) Filipino loyalists	Filipino rebel groups; Muslim resistance; British supporters; Bruneian and Ottoman supporters; (Japan) Japanese and Chinese supporters	Victory for Spain: Most revolts failed
Blockade of Cebu (1568)	Spain: (Spain) Filipino loyalists	(Portugal) Portuguese Empire	Victory for Spain
Eighty Years' War, Thirty Years' War (1568-1648): Battle of San Juan (1625); Battle in the Bay of Matanzas (1628); Battle of St. Kitts (1629); Recovery of Saint Martin (1633); Attack on San Martin (1644)	Spanish Empire: (Spain) Spanish Netherlands; Crown of Castile; New Spain; Peru; Crown of Portugal (1580–1640); State of Brazil; Crown of Aragon; Kingdom of Sicily; Kingdom of Naples; Kingdom of Sardinia; Holy Roman Empire: Archduchy of Austria; Electorate of Bavaria; Catholic League; Kingdom of Hungary Kingdom of Croatia Supported by: Polish–Lithuanian Commonwealth; Papal States	United Provinces: Dutch East Indies; Dutch West Indies; England France Nassau Bohemia Electorate of the Palatinate Transylvania Denmark–Norway Venice Savoy Duchy of Mantua Duchy of Modena Duchy of Parma Sweden Saxony Brandenburg-Prussia Kingdom of Portugal (1640–58) Principality of Catalonia (from 1640) Supported by: Tsardom of Russia; Ottoman Empire	Defeat for Spain: Foundation of the Dutch colonial Empire after obtaining its independence from the Hispanic Monarchy.; Expulsion of the Anglo, French, Dutch and Danish pirates from the American coasts, with repression of colonization attempts.; Peace of Westphalia, Peace of Münster and Treaty of the Pyrenees; Dutch–Portuguese War (1601–1661) and Spanish–Portuguese War (1640–1668) continue, without attacks to Mexican domains.
Castilian War (1578): Part of Ottoman-Habsburg Wars on Southeast Asia and Spanish-Moro Wars	Spanish Empire: (Spain) Spanish Philippines; Indian auxiliaries from Mexico and Peru; Bruneians who defected to Spain	Bruneian Empire Sultanate of Sulu Maguindanao Supported by: Ottoman Empire: Turks, Egyptians, Swahilis, Somalis, Sindhis, Gujaratis, and Malabars forces; (Aceh Sultanate) Sultanate of Aceh	Status quo ante bellum: Bruneian military victory to seize its independence from Spanish Empire. Becoming a city-state until today.; Spanish tactical Victory in ending Bruneian empire at sea and its influence on Philippines
1582 Cagayan battles (1582)	Spain: New Spain; (Spain) Spanish Philippines; Indian auxiliaries from Mexico (mostly Tlaxcalans)	(Japan) Wokou (Japanese, Chinese, and Korean pirates)	Victory for Spain
Anglo-Spanish War (1585–1604): Battle of San Juan de Ulúa (1568); Battle of Santo Domingo (1586); Thomas Cavendish's circumnavigation; Watts' West Indies and Virginia expedition; Blockade of Western Cuba; Raid on Puerto Caballos (1594); Drake and Hawkins expedition; Preston–Somers expedition; Raleigh's El Dorado expedition; Battle of Pinos; Battle of San Juan (1598); Raid on Tabasco (1599); Battle of Puerto Caballos (1603); Raid on Santiago de Cuba (1603)	Spanish Empire: (Spain) Spanish Netherlands; Crown of Castile; New Spain; Peru; Crown of Portugal (1580–1640); State of Brazil; Crown of Aragon; Kingdom of Sicily; Kingdom of Naples; Kingdom of Sardinia; Duchy of Parma Grand Duchy of Tuscany Duchy of Savoy Duchy of Castro (Sovereign Military Order of Malta) Order of Saint John co-belligerent: French rebels; Irish rebels	Kingdom of England: Corsairs; (Kingdom of Ireland) Ireland co-belligerent: (Portugal) Portuguese rebels; United Provinces; (Kingdom of France) France; Huguenots	Indecisive, Status quo ante bellum: Expulsion of the English from Spanish America and end of English interruption to Spanish transatlantic transportation and colonial expansion.; The English privateers now find their needs in the service of the Dutch.; England obtains the Colony of Newfoundland and Bermuda, beginning the English colonial Empire.; Treaty of London
Acoma War (1598–1599): Part of Mexican Indian Wars	New Spain	Acoma Pueblo	Defeat
Spanish-Portuguese conflict on China (1598–1600)	(Spain) Spanish Empire: (Spain) El Piñal; (Spain) Captaincy General of the Philippines	Portuguese Empire: Macau; Portuguese India	Defeat for Spain: End of Spain's attempts to circumvent the restrictions placed on them from reaching China.; Portuguese monopoly on the 16th century China trade.
Acaxee Rebellion (1601–1607): Part of Mexican Indian Wars	New Spain	Acaxee Indians	Defeat
Tepehuán Revolt (1616–1620)	New Spain	Tepehuánes	Defeat
Spanish conquest of Petén (c. 1618 – c. 1697): Part of Spanish colonization of the Americas	New Spain: (Spain) Captaincy General of Guatemala.	Independent Maya, including: Itza people; Kowoj people; Kejache people; Yalain people; Lakandon Chʼol people; Manche Ch'ol people	Defeat: Incorporation of the Petén Basin into the Captaincy General of Guatemala.
Sacalum Rebellion (1624)	New Spain	Maya rebel forces lidered by the Batab Ah Kin Pol	Defeat
Franco-Spanish War (1635–1659): Capura of Fort Rocher on Turtle Island (1654)	Spanish Empire: (Spain) Spanish Netherlands; (Spain) Spanish Italy; New Spain; Modena and Reggio (1635–46) Holy Roman Empire (until 1648) English Royalists (from 1657)	France Dutch Republic (until 1648) Duchy of Savoy Duchy of Modena (1647–1649 and 1655–1659) Duchy of Parma (1635–1637) Commonwealth of England (1654–59) Principality of Catalonia (from 1640) Kingdom of Portugal (1640–59)	Defeat for Spain: Treaty of the Pyrenees
Apache Wars (c. 1641–1924): First Magdalena massacre; Second Magdalena massacre; Part of Mexican Indian Wars	New Spain (until 1821) Mexico (1821–1915) United States (1850–1924) Confederate States (1861–1865)	Apache	Spanish/Mexican victory
Navajo Wars (c. 1641–1864): Part of Mexican Indian Wars	New Spain (until 1821) Mexico (1821–1848) United States (1850–1866)	Navajo	United States victory: Navajo moved to reservations and United
Anglo-Spanish War (1654–1660): Siege of Santo Domingo (1655); Invasion of Jamaica (1655); Battle of Ocho Rios (1657); Battle of Rio Nuevo (1658); Henry Morgan's Panama expedition	Spain: New Spain; (Spain) Peru	Commonwealth of England	Defeat for Spain: Treaties of Madrid (1667 and 1670); Acquisition of Jamaica, the Cayman Islands, Dunkirk and Mardyck by the Commonwealth of England
Tehuantepec Rebellion (1660–1661)	New Spain	Zapotec peoples	Defeat: A royal decree favorable to the Indians was published, in which their "repartimiento" was abolished, that is, forced labor was put to an end. Then the rebellions ends and their leaders are delivered to the Spanish justice.
Piracy attacks on Lake Nicaragua (1665–1857)	New Spain: (Spain) Captaincy General of Guatemala; Nicaragua Costa Rica El Salvador Guatemala	West Indies Pirates American Filibusters	Stalemate: Piracy and filibustering suppressed by 1857
Chepo expedition (1679–1681)	New Spain: (Spain) Captaincy General of Guatemala; (Spain) Peru: (Spain) New Kingdom of Granada	(Kingdom of England) English pirates	Defeat for Spain: Looting and then burning the town of Chepo, Panama.
Pueblo Revolt (1680): Part of Mexican Indian Wars	New Spain	Puebloans	Victory: Expulsion of Spanish settlers
War of the Spanish Succession (1701–1712): Queen Anne's War; Battle of Flint River; Siege of St. Augustine; Apalachee massacre; Lefebvre's Charles Town expedition; Siege of Pensacola; Raid on Nassau	Spain loyal to Philip: Crown of Castile; New Spain; (Spain) Spanish Texas; (Spain) Peru; Kingdom of Naples; Kingdom of Sicily; Kingdom of France: New France; (Kingdom of France) French East India Company; Bavaria (until 1704) Duchy of Mantua (until 1708) Cologne (until 1702) Liège (until 1702) Indian Allies: Wabanaki Confederacy; Caughnawaga Mohawk; Choctaw; Timucua; Apalachee; Natchez; co-belligerent: Kuruc (Kingdom of Hungary); Principality of Transylvania	Holy Roman Empire: Austria; Prussia (from 1702); Hanover; Great Britain (formed on 1707): England (until 1707); Scotland (until 1707); British America; British East India Company; Dutch Republic Duchy of Savoy (after 1703) Kingdom of Portugal (from 1703): State of Brazil; Spain loyal to Charles: Crown of Aragon; (Spain) Spanish Netherlands; (Denmark) Danish Auxiliary Corps Indian Allies: Muscogee (Creek); Chickasaw; Yamasee; Iroquois Confederacy; co-belligerent: Hungarian Royalists; Kingdom of Croatia	Political victory for Spain loyal to Philip Military victory for Spain loyal to Charles: Treaty of Utrecht (1713); Treaty of Rastatt (1714); Treaty of Baden (1714); Philip is recognised as King of Spain, but once more renounces any claim to the throne of France.
Comanche Wars (1706–1875): Part of Mexican Indian Wars and Texas–Indian wars	New Spain (until 1820) Mexico (since 1821) Republic of Texas (since 1836) Choctaw Republic United States (since 1845)	Comanche Other Indigenous nations	Defeat
Pablo Presbere's insurrection (1709–1710): Part of Mexican indian war	New Spain: (Spain) Captaincy General of Guatemala	Talamanca Teribe Cabécare	Defeat
Tzeltal Rebellion of 1712 (1712): Part of Mexican Indian Wars	New Spain: (Spain) Captaincy General of Guatemala	Maya communities	Defeat
War of the Quadruple Alliance (1718–1720): Villasur expedition; Capture of Pensacola (1719); Raid on Nassau (1720)	Spain: New Spain; (Spain) Spanish Florida; (Spain) Spanish Texas; Jacobites	Great Britain: (British Empire) British West Indies; France: New France; Holy Roman Empire: Austria; Viceroyalty of Naples; Viceroyalty of Sardignia; Dutch Republic Savoy: Viceroyalty of Sicily	Defeat for Spain: Treaty of The Hague: Spain renounces claims to its former Italian possessions.; Savoy and Austria swap Sicily for Habsburgs and Sardinia for Savoy.
Aguayo expedition to Texas (1720–1722)	New Spain: (Spain) Spanish Texas	New France: French Louisiana	Victory for Spain: French raids to New Spain stops; Beginning of Spanish ranching in Texas
Pericúes Rebellion (1734–1737)	New Spain	Pericúes Cochimí	Stalemate: The colonization of Southern Baja Peninsula stopped for 3 years. Then revolt suppressed.
Pima Revolt (1751): Part of Mexican Indian Wars	New Spain: (Spain) Spanish Arizona	Pima Indians	Victory for Spain
Seven Years' War (1756–1763): Anglo-Spanish War (1762–1763); Siege of Havana; Battle for Río San Juan de Nicaragua; Battle of Manila (1762); Action of 30 October 1762; Silang Revolt; Guagua Insurrection	Spanish Empire: New Spain; (Spain) Viceroyalty of Peru; France: (Kingdom of France) French West Indies; New France; Abenaki nation	Great Britain: (British Empire) British America; Iroquois Confederacy; Portugal Filipino rebels	Defeat for Spain: Treaty of Saint Petersburg (1762); Treaty of Hamburg (1762); Treaty of Paris (1763); Treaty of Hubertusburg (1763); Status quo ante bellum in Europe; Transfer of colonial possessions between Great Britain, France, and Spain after French-Indian war.; Spain cedes Florida to Britain in exchange for return of Havana.; Spain received Louisiana from France.
Cisteil Rebellion (1761)	New Spain: (Spain) Captaincy General of Yucatán	Maya rebel forces lidered by Jacinto Canek	Defeat: Instigators are captured and punished
Louisiana Rebellion of 1768 (1768)	New Spain: (Spain) Louisiana	Louisiana Creole people	Victory for Spain
American Revolutionary War (1775–1783): Spain and the American Revolutionary War; Western theater of the American Revolutionary War; Southern theater of the American Revolutionary War; Gulf Coast campaign; Spanish conquest of West Florida; Battle of St. Louis; Siege of Pensacola; Colbert raid; Naval battles of the American Revolutionary War; Action of 15 January 1782; Capture of the Bahamas (1782); Action of 17 February 1783; Capture of the Bahamas (1783); Central America; Capture of Río Hondo; Capture of Cayo Cocina; Battle of San Fernando de Omoa; Action of 12 December 1779; San Juan Expedition (1780); Battle of Roatán; Battle of the Black River	United States Spain: New Spain; (Spain) Louisiana; France: Canadian Auxiliaries; Iroquois: Oneida; Tuscarora; Watauga Association Catawba Lenape Choctaw Dutch Republic Mysore	Great Britain: Loyalists of Thirteen Colonies; British Canada; Iroquois: Onondaga; Cayuga; Seneca; Cherokee German Auxiliaries	Victory for Spain: Treaty of Paris (1783); Britain recognizes the independence of the United States of America and the Thirteen Colonies.
Cherokee–American wars [2nd phase post-revolution] (1783–1795): Part of American Indian Wars	Spanish Empire: New Spain; (Spain) Louisiana; Cherokee Co-belligerent: Northwestern Confederacy	United States	Spanish withdrawal due to Coalition Wars. Defeat of Cherokees: Treaty of Tellico
Nootka Crisis (1789–1790): Part of Spanish expeditions to the Pacific Northwest	Spanish Empire: New Spain	Great Britain: (British Empire) British North America (The Canadas); Nuu-chah-nulth people Russian Empire: Russian Alaska; United States	Spanish fail: Nootka Convention
Haitian Revolution (1791–1804)	1791–1793 Ex-slaves French royalists (Spain) Spanish Empire (from 1793): New Spain; (Spain) Captaincy General of Santo Domingo; 1793–1798 French royalists Great Britain (Spain) Spanish Empire (until 1795): (Spain) Captaincy General of Santo Domingo; 1798–1801 (France) Louverture Loyalists 1802–1804 Ex-slaves United Kingdom	1791–1793 Slave owners Kingdom of France (until 1792) (France) French Republic 1793–1798 (France) French Republic: Ex-slaves; 1798–1801 (France) Rigaud Loyalists (France) French Republic: Polish Legions	Defeat for Spain
French Revolutionary Wars (1792–1802): West Indies Campaign; East Indies theatre; Anglo-Spanish War (1796–1808)	(France) French Republic: French India; (Spain) Spanish Empire (since 1795): (Spain) Spanish East Indies; Batavian Republic: Dutch East Indies; Polish Legions Denmark–Norway French client republics: Helvetic Republic; (Kingdom of Italy (Napoleonic)) Cisalpine Republic; (Kingdom of Italy (Napoleonic)) Roman Republic (until 1799); (Kingdom of Italy (Napoleonic)) Parthenopaean Republic (1799)	Great Britain: British East India Company; Portugal (Spain) Spanish Empire (until 1795); Holy Roman Empire: (Habsburg monarchy) Austria; Prussia (until 1795); Russia (until 1801): Septinsular Republic; Sardinia (until 1796) Naples: Sanfedismo; Grand Duchy of Tuscany (Sovereign Military Order of Malta) Order of Saint John (1798) Malta (1798–1800) Ottoman Empire (since 1798) (Kingdom of France) French Royalists United States (Quasi-War) (until 1800)	Inconclusive: Treaty of Amiens
Napoleonic Wars (1803–1815): Caribbean campaign of 1803–1810; Anglo-Spanish War (1804-1808)	Coalition forces: United Kingdom; Holy Roman Empire (until 1806); Austria (Note: 1805, 1809, 1813–1815) (Note: The term Austrian Empire came into use after Napoleon crowned himself Emperor of the French in 1804, by which Francis II, Holy Roman Emperor took the title Emperor of Austria (Kaiser von Österreich) in response. The Holy Roman Empire was dissolved in 1806, and consequently Emperor of Austria became Francis' primary title. For this reason, Austrian Empire is often used instead of Holy Roman Empire for brevity's sake when speaking of the Napoleonic Wars, even though the two entities are not synonymous.) (Note: Both Austria and Prussia briefly became allies of France and contributed forces to the French Invasion of Russia in 1812.); Prussia (Note: 1806–1807, 1813–1815); Russia (Note: 1804–1807, 1812–1815) (Note: Russia became an ally of France following the Treaty of Tilsit in 1807. The alliance broke down in 1810, which led to the French invasion in 1812. During that time Russia waged war against Sweden (1808–1809) and the Ottoman Empire (1806–1812), and nominally against Britain (1807–1812).); Spain (Note: 1808–1815) (Note: Spain was an ally of France until a stealthy French invasion in 1808, then fought France in the Peninsular War.); Sweden (Note: 1804–1809, 1812–1815) (Note: Nominally, Sweden declared war against Great Britain after its defeat by Russia in the Finnish War (1808–1809).); (Kingdom of Portugal) Portugal (Note: 1800–1807, 1809–1815); Ottoman Empire (Note: 1807–1812) (Note: The Ottoman Empire fought against Napoleon in the French Campaign in Egypt and Syria as part of the French Revolutionary Wars. During the Napoleonic era of 1803 to 1815, the Empire participated in two wars against the Allies: against Britain in the Anglo-Turkish War (1807–1809) and against Russia in the Russo-Turkish War (1806–1812). Russia was allied with Napoleon 1807–1810.); Bavaria (Note: 1813–1815); (Duchy of Brunswick) Brunswick (Note: 1815); (Kingdom of France) French Royalists; (Province of Hanover) Hanover (Note: Hanover was in a personal union with Great Britain); Hungary (Note: 1809) (Note: The Kingdom of Hungary participated in the war with separate Hungarian regiments in the Imperial and Royal Army, and also by a traditional army ("insurrectio"). The Hungarian Diet voted to join in war and agreed to pay one third of the war expenses.); Liechtenstein; Montenegro (Note: 1806–1807, 1813–1814); Nassau; (United Kingdom of the Netherlands) Netherlands; Baden; Papal States; Qajar Iran (Note: Qajar dynasty fought against Russia from 1804 to 1813; the Russians were allied with Napoleon 1807–1812.); Sardinia; Saxony; (Kingdom of Sicily) Sicily (Note: 1806–1815) (Note: Sicily remained in personal union with Naples until Naples became a French client-republic following the Battle of Campo Tenese in 1806.); Switzerland; Tuscany; Württemberg; Denmark (Note: 1814)	(First French Empire) French Empire (from 1804) French clients: Batavian Republic (Note: From 1803 till 1806, when it became the Kingdom of Holland); Bonapartist Spain; Confederation of the Rhine (Note: 1808–1813) (Note: Sixteen of France's allies among the German states (including Bavaria and Württemberg) established the Confederation of the Rhine in July 1806 following the Battle of Austerlitz (December 1805). Following the Battle of Jena-Auerstedt (October 1806), various other German states that had previously fought alongside the anti-French allies, including Saxony and Westphalia, also allied with France and joined the Confederation. Saxony changed sides again in 1813 during the Battle of Leipzig, causing most other member-states to quickly follow suit and declare war on France.) (Note: These four states were the leading nations of the Confederation, but the Confederation was made up of a total of 43 principalities, kingdoms, and duchies.); (Kingdom of Bavaria) Bavaria; Saxony; (Kingdom of Westphalia) Westphalia; (Kingdom of Württemberg) Württemberg; Duchy of Warsaw (Note: Napoleon established the Duchy of Warsaw, ruled by the Kingdom of Saxony in 1807. Polish Legions had already been serving in the French armies beforehand.); (Kingdom of Etruria) Etruria (Note: The French Empire annexed the Kingdom of Etruria in 1807.); (Netherlands) Holland (Note: The French Empire annexed the Kingdom of Holland in 1810. Dutch troops fought against Napoleon during the Hundred Days in 1815.); (Kingdom of Italy (Napoleonic)) Italy; Lucca-Piombino; (Kingdom of Naples) Naples (Note: Naples, briefly allied with Austria in 1814, allied with France again and fought against Austria during the Neapolitan War in 1815.); Polish Legions; (Old Swiss Confederacy) Switzerland; (Austrian Empire) Austria (Note: 1809–1813); Denmark–Norway (Note: Denmark–Norway remained neutral until the Battle of Copenhagen (1807). Denmark was compelled to cede Norway to Sweden by the Treaty of Kiel in 1814. Following a brief Swedish campaign against Norway, Norway entered a personal union with Sweden.) (Note: 1807–1814); Qajar Iran (Note: 1804–1807, 1812–1813); Ottoman Empire; (Kingdom of Prussia) Prussia; (Russian Empire) Russia; Spain (Note: 1803–1808)	Victory for Spain/Victory for Mexico: Congress of Vienna; Ceasefire on New Spain and start of Mexican War of Independence
Anglo-American war (1812–1814): Battle of Pensacola (1814)	United Kingdom: (British Empire) British North America (The Canadas); Tecumseh's Confederacy Kingdom of Spain (from 1813): New Spain; (Spain) Spanish Florida	United States Indian allies: Choctaw Nation; Cherokee Nation; Creek Allies	Inconclusive: Treaty of Ghent; Spain loses West Florida to the United States.
Gutiérrez–Magee Expedition (1812): Battle of Medina	Viceroyalty of New Spain	Republican Army of the North; Filibuster	Victory for Spain
Seminole Wars (1817–18)	Seminole New Spain: (Spain) Spanish Florida	United States	Defeat for Spain: Spain cedes Spanish Florida to the United States in the Adams–Onís Treaty of 1819; The United States forcibly relocates Seminole in northern Florida to a reservation in the center of the peninsula in the Treaty of Moultrie Creek of 1823
Totonicapán Uprising of 1820 (1820)	New Spain: (Spain) Captaincy General of Guatemala	K'iche of Totonicapán	Defeat

== Independent Mexico ==
Key
Mexican victory
Mexican defeat
Ceasefire or other result
Ongoing conflict

Conflict	Combatant 1	Combatant 2	Results	Casualties
Mexican War of Independence (1810–1821)	Insurgents; Army of the Three Guarantees	Spanish Empire: Viceroyalty of New Spain	Victory: First Mexican Empire gains independence from Spain; Signing of the Treaty of Córdoba; Plan of Iguala achieved; Spain loses the continental area of the Viceroyalty of New Spain with the exception of the port San Juan de Ulúa, Veracruz; Spain would not recognize Mexican independence until signing the Santa María–Calatrava Treaty in 1836	+500,000
Long Expedition (1819)	Spanish Empire (Until 1819) (Mexico) First Mexican Empire (From 1821)	Long Republic	Victory: Rebels defeated and captured; James Long shot and killed in custody	~5 (1821 expedition)
Texas–Indian Wars (1820–1875)	Spain (until 1821); Mexico; Republic of Texas (from 1836 to 1846); Choctaw Republic; United States; Confederate States (from 1861–1865)	Comanche; Other Indigenous nations	Victory: Extinction of many tribes in Texas, including the Karankawa, Akokisa and Bidai	1,394
Spanish Attempts to Reconquer Mexico (1821–1829)	First Mexican Empire (1821–23); Provisional Government (1823–24); First Mexican Republic (1824–29)	(Spain) Spanish Empire	Victory: Spain recognizes the independence of the United States of Mexico in 1829	135
Comanche–Mexico Wars (1821–1870)	Mexico	Comanche; Kiowa; Kiowa Apache	Defeat: Many successful raids by Comanche	~6,000
Apache–Mexico Wars (1600s–1915); Part of the Mexican Indian Wars and the American Indian Wars	Kingdom of Spain (1600–1821); Mexico (1821–1915); Republic of Texas (1836–1846); United States (1850–1924); Confederate States (1861–1865)	Apache	Victory: Apache gradually defeated in Mexico and the United States	
Yaqui Wars (1533–1929); Part of the Mexican Indian Wars	Crown of Castile (1533–1716); Spain (1716–1821); Mexico (1821–1929); United States (1896–1918)	Yaqui; Yaqui Allies: Mayo; Opata; Pima	Victory: Yaqui revolts put down	
Mexican Indian Wars (1821–1933)	Crown of Castile (1519–1716); Tlaxcalans and other Native Indian allies of Spain (1519–1821); Spain (1716–1823); Mexico (1821–1933); Guatemala (1823–1933); Honduras (1823–1933); El Salvador (1823–1933) England (1638–1707); United Kingdom (1707–1862); British Honduras (1862–1933) Republic of Texas (1836–1846); California Republic (1846); United States (1850–1933); Confederate States (1861–1865)	Various Native Mexicans: Aztec Empire; Maya people; Tarascans; Chichimecans; Puebloans; Comanches; Apaches; Yaquis	Victory	
Rebellion of Felipe de la Garza	Mexico	(Mexico) Republicans	Imperialist victory	
Salvadoran-Mexican War	Mexico	El Salvador	Victory El Salvador is annexed to Mexico	
Casa Mata Plan Revolution (1822–1823)	(Mexico) Republicans	(Mexico) First Mexican Empire	Republican Victory	
Texas revolt (1823)	(Mexico) Mexican Provisional Government	(Mexico) Imperialists	Provisional Government Victory	
Rebellion of Oaxaca (1823)	Provisional Government of Mexico	Oaxaca	Provisional Government Victory	
Rebellion of Guadalajara (1823)	Provisional Government of Mexico	Jalisco	Provisional Government Victory: Constitution of Colima as Territory of the Nation	
Rebellion of Puebla (1823)	Provisional Government of Mexico	Independents	Provisional Government Victory	
Revolt of Querétaro (1823)	Provisional Government of Mexico	Imperialists	Provisional Government Victory	
Iturbidist uprising in Tepic (1824)	(Mexico) Mexican Provisional Government	(Mexico) Imperialists	Provisional Government Victory	
Fredonian Rebellion (1826–1827)	Mexico	Texian rebels	Victory: Edwards Rebels defeated; Comanches convinced to back down and peace treaty established; Mexican amnesty for rebels except the Edwards brothers, Martin Parmer, and Adolphus Sterne; A larger Mexican garrison established in Nacogdoches; Law restricting immigration into Texas; The Edwards flee to the United States (returning later for the Texas Revolution)	
Conservative Coup (1829–1831)	(Mexico) Conservatives	(Mexico) Liberals	Conservative Victory: Anastasio Bustamante and Conservatives oust liberal president Vicente Guerrero in 1829; Capture and execution of Guerrero, defeat of Guerrero's forces	
Zacatecas Rebellion (1835)	(Mexico) Centralists	Zacatecan Rebels	Centralist Victory: Creation of Aguascalientes Territory separated from Zacatecas	
Texas Revolution (1835–1836)	Mexico	Texas	Inconclusive: Treaties of Velasco (1836); Creation of the Republic of Texas (1836); Mexican invasions of Texas (1842); Annexation of Texas by the United States of America (1845); Outbreak of the Mexican–American War (1846–1848); Texas fails to expand	
Rebellion in Sonora and Sinaloa (1837-1839)	Mexico	Federalists	Victory: José Urrea is taken prisoner	
First Franco–Mexican War (1838–1839) also known as the Pastry War	Mexico	France; United Kingdom	Defeat: Mexican government accepts to pay the 600,000 pesos	
Federalist Revolt (Tabasco) (1839–1840)	Mexico; Tabasco centralists	Tabasco federalists Texas; Republic of Yucatán	Defeat	
Rebellion of the Republic of the Rio Grande (1840)	Mexico	Republic of the Rio Grande	Victory: Dissolution of the Republic of Rio Grande	
Texan Santa Fe Expedition (1841–1842)	Mexico	Texas	Victory	
Occupation of Soconusco	Mexico	Guatemala	Victory: The Soconusco is annexed to Mexico	
Invasion of Yucatán (1842-1843)	Mexico	Republic of Yucatán; Texas (Naval Battle of Campeche)	Defeat	
Mexicans Invasions of 1842 (1842)	Mexico	Texas	Defeat: Vásquez captures San Antonio for a short time; Beginning of the Texas Archives War after Vasquez's raid; Canales are repelled in the Fort of Lipantitlan; Both sides claim victory in Woll's expedition; Beginning of the Somervell expedition	
Capture of Monterey (1842)	Mexico	United States	Status quo ante bellum: Americans leave the city after hearing war did not break out	
Mier Expedition (1842–1843)	Mexico	Texas	Victory: Texan soldiers were forced to surrender	
Texan raids on New Mexico (1843)	Mexico	Texas	Victory: Mexico retains control over New Mexico	
Mexican–American War (1846–1848)	Mexico	United States; California; Texas	Defeat: Treaty of Guadalupe Hidalgo; United States took ownership of California and a large area comprising roughly half of New Mexico, most of Arizona, Nevada, and Utah, and parts of Wyoming and Colorado; Mexican recognition of Texas (and the Mexican Cession) as U.S. territory; End of conflict between Mexico and Texas	
Caste War of Yucatán (1847–1901)	Mexico; Yucatán; Guatemala; United Kingdom; British Honduras	Maya	Victory: Republic of Yucatán rejoins the United Mexican States in 1848; Mayas achieve an independent state from 1847 to 1883; Mexico recaptures Yucatán; Conflict between the Mexicans and the Mayans continued until 1933	
Rousset's Expeditions (1853-1854)	Mexico	Filibusters	Victory: Gaston Raousset is captured and sentenced to death	
Expedition of William Walker to Baja California and Sonora (1853-1854)	Mexico	Republic of Sonora; Republic of Baja California	Victory: William Walker trial in San Diego	
Revolution of Ayutla (1854–1855)	(Mexico) Liberals	(Mexico) Conservatives	Liberal Victory: Juan Álvarez leads overthrow of Antonio López de Santa Anna; Final defeat of Santa Anna and step toward the Reform	
Reform War (1857–1861)	(Mexico) Liberals	(Mexico) Conservatives	Liberal Victory: Benito Juárez rises to power in Mexico	
Cortina Troubles (1859–1861)	Mexico; United States; Confederate States	(Mexico) Cortinista Militia	Victory: Raids ended	
Second Franco–Mexican War (1861–1867)	Mexico	(France) French Empire (Mexico) Mexican Empire; Austrian Empire; Belgium; Spain; United Kingdom; Egypt Eyalet; Polish Revolutionaries	Victory: Establishment, then fall, of the Second Mexican Empire; French withdrawal; Execution of Emperor Maximilian I, Miguel Miramon, and Tomas Mejia	
Victorio's War (1879–1881)	United States; Mexico	Apache	Victory: Apache defeated	
Raid in Tuxtla Chico (1880)	Mexico	Central American filibusters	Victory	
Barrios' War of Reunification (1885)	El Salvador; Mexico; Costa Rica; Nicaragua	Guatemala; Honduras	Victory: Death of Justo Rufino Barrios	
Garza Revolution (1891–1893)	Mexico; United States	Garzistas	Victory: Garza Revolution defeated	
Mexican annexation of Clipperton Island (1897)	Mexico	France	Victory: Mexican annexation, colony established	
Second Totoposte War (1903)	El Salvador; Mexico (Guatemala) Guatemalan Exiles	Guatemala	Stalemate: Status quo ante bellum	
Third Totoposte War (1906)	El Salvador; Mexico (Guatemala) Guatemalan Exiles	Guatemala	Stalemate: Status quo ante bellum	
Acayucan Rebellion (1906)	(Mexico) Mexican Government	Liberal Party of Mexico	Government Victory	
Mexican Revolution (1910–1920)	Counter-Revolutionaries Mexico United States (1910–1913) Germany (1913–1917): Porfiristas; Huertistas	(Mexico) Revolutionaries United States (1913–1918) United Kingdom (1916–1918) Germany (1917): Constitutional Army; Villistas; Zapatistas	Revolutionary Victory: Porfirio Díaz and Victoriano Huerta ousted from power and exiled; Mexican Constitution of 1917 enacted; Defeat of rebellious Villa and Zapata by their Constitutionalists pairs; Political assassination of presidents and revolutionary leaders; Founding of the National Revolutionary Party	
Border War (1910–1919)	Mexico; Germany	United States	Status quo ante bellum: Seditionist insurgency suppressed; Permanent border wall established; American troops fail to capture Pancho Villa and withdraw from Chihuahua	
Magonista Rebellion (1911)	Mexico	Liberal Party of Mexico	Victory: Failure of the libertarian insurrection	
Antichina Campaign (1911–1934)	(Mexico) Mexican Government	(China) (Japan) Asiatic migrants	Stalemate: Antichina Campaigns ends in 1934 by change of government, but the Asiatic population was effectively reduced.	
Delahuertista Rebellion (1923–1924): Tabasco Rebellion	(Mexico) Mexican Government: Castillistas; Regional Confederation of Mexican Workers; Agrarians	(Mexico) Delahuertistas: PNC; PLC	Government Victory	
Cristero War (1926–1929)	(Mexico) Mexican Government	National League for the Defense of Religious Liberty	Government Ceasefire: The Mexican Government makes peace agreement with Cristeros, assisted by the United States through U.S. Ambassador to Mexico, Dwight Whitney Morrow, in order to end violence; Recognition of certain rights and the Catholic Church reopens in Mexico by 1929 during the presidency of Emilio Portes Gil, although some anti-clerical government laws remained in place until 1992, when the Mexican government amended the constitution by granting all religious groups legal status, conceding them limited property rights and lifting restrictions on the number of priests in the country	
Escobar Rebellion (1929)	(Mexico) Mexican Government	Escobar Rebels	Government Victory: Escobar rebels defeated	
Saturnino Cedillo Rebellion (1938)	(Mexico) Mexican Government: PRI; Supported by: Mexican Communist Party; Popular Socialist Party	Cedillistas: Confederation of the Middle Class; Pro-Race Committee; Revolutionary Mexicanist Action; National Synarchist Union; (Nazi Germany) German Community of Mexico	Government Victory: Fascist uprising ends after 8 months.; Death of Saturnino Cedillo.	
World War II (1942–1945): Philippines campaign (1944–1945); Pacific War; Battle of Luzon	United States; Soviet Union; United Kingdom; China; France; Poland; Canada; Australia; New Zealand; India; South Africa; Yugoslavia; Greece; Denmark; Norway; Netherlands; Belgium; Luxembourg; Czechoslovakia; Brazil; Mexico; Panama; Costa Rica; El Salvador; Guatemala; Honduras; Nicaragua; Dominican Republic; Cuba; Chile; Bolivia; Colombia; Ecuador; Paraguay; Peru; Venezuela; Uruguay; Argentina	Germany; Japan; Italy; Hungary; Romania; Bulgaria; Croatia; Slovakia; Finland; Thailand; Manchukuo; Mengjiang	Victory: Collapse of the Third Reich; Fall of Japanese and Italian Empires; Creation of the United Nations; Emergence of the United States and the Soviet Union as superpowers; Beginning of the Cold War	
Mexico–Guatemala Conflict (1958–1959)	Mexico	Guatemala	Ceasefire: Mexican retaliation halted by newly elected president Adolfo López Mateos; Diplomatic relations between the two nations are frozen for several months; South American mediation helps to prevent escalation	
Dirty War (1964–1982); Part of the Cold War	Mexico: Institutional Revolutionary Party; DFS - Security Directorate (Intelligence); Armed Forces (Military); Judicial Police (Law enforcement); United States (small arms, ammunition, and explosives, as well as supporting the Mexican government and asking for action against leftists)	Far-left groups: Mexican Communist Party; People's Guerrilla Group; Party of the Poor; National Revolutionary Civic Association; Liga Comunista 23 de Septiembre; National Liberation Forces; Various other social and armed movements in the country	Government victory: Continued rule of the Institutional Revolutionary Party; Most leftist guerrilla groups disbanded; After the conflict: Several acts of violence have not yet been clarified.; Political defeat of the PRI in the 2000 presidential elections before the National Action Party (PAN).; Grouping of the political left and formation of the Party of the Democratic Revolution (PRD).; Dissolution of Dirección Federal de Seguridad for crimes committed during Mexican Dirty War and for having alliances with Guadalajara Cartel and drug lords like Ernesto Fonseca Carrillo and Rafael Caro Quintero	
Zapatista Uprising (1994); Part of the Chiapas conflict	Mexico: Mexican Armed Forces	EZLN	Ceasefire between Mexican Military and EZLN: Insurgency contained but unable to be destroyed; Zapatistas granted rights to self-government and autonomy; Founding of Rebel Zapatista Autonomous Municipalities.	
Mexican drug war (2006–present); Part of the war on drugs	Mexico; Armed Forces; National Guard (2019–present); Federal Police (2006–2019); State and municipal police forces; Consulting and training support: United States; Mérida Initiative; Colombia; National Police of Colombia; Australia; Australian Federal Police; Canada; RCMP ACCBP; Philippines; National Bureau of Investigation; Non-state armed groups: Popular Revolutionary Army (EPR); Zapatistas (EZLN); Self-defense groups	Principal Mexican cartels: Gulf Cartel; Los Metros; Los Rojos; Sinaloa Cartel; Los Chapitos; La Mayiza; CJNG; LNFM; Los Viagras; Northeast Cartel; Los Zetas; United Cartels; Other cartels: LFM; CSRL; Juárez Cartel; Tijuana Cartel; La Barredora; La Unión Tepito; Dismantled cartels: Milenio Cartel (1980–2010); Beltrán-Leyva Cartel (1996–2017); Independent Cartel of Acapulco (2010–2014); Knights Templar Cartel (2010–2017); Support: Mexican Narcosystem; Organized crime in Italy; (Albania) Albanian mafia; Mexican Mafia; Mara Salvatrucha	Ongoing	

== See also ==
- Mexico in World War I
- List of ongoing armed conflicts
- Timeline of Mexican War of Independence
- Mexican War of Independence
