= Mexican War =

Mexican War may refer to:

- Mexican War of Independence (1810–21)
- Mexican–American War (1846–48)
- Second French intervention in Mexico (1861–67)
- Mexican Revolution (1910–20)
- Cristero War (1926–1929)

== See also ==
- List of wars involving Mexico
- Mexican drug war
