= Magdalena Massacre =

Magdalena Massacre may refer to:

- The First Magdalena massacre, a 1757 attack on the Spanish mission village of Magdalena de Kino
- The Second Magdalena massacre, 1776 attack on the same mission village
