= Battle of Agua Prieta =

The Battle of Agua Prieta could refer to:

- First Battle of Agua Prieta in April 1911, during the Mexican Revolution, or
- Second Battle of Agua Prieta on November 1 of 1915, during the Mexican Revolution.
