= Rebellion of Puebla =

Date	December 1823
Location	Puebla, Mexico
Result	Provisional Government victory

Belligerents
Provisional Government of Mexico	Independents

Commanders and leaders
Vicente Guerrero Manual Gomez Pedraza	José María Calderón; José Antonio de Echávarri

Strength
800 Soldiers Guerrero Division	1,030

Casualties and losses
100 dead and 290 injured	600 dead and 400 captured

The Rebellion of Puebla in 1823 was an armed conflict led by independence-supporting factions after the fall of the First Mexican Empire and the victory of the Casa Mata Plan Revolution.

== The Sovereign State of Puebla ==
While the Revolt of Querétaro was ongoing, the province of Puebla declared itself a sovereign state, installing a government composed of Brigadier José María Calderón; Manuel Posada Garduño, who was later appointed Archbishop of Mexico; and others.

== State response ==
To repress this independent proclamation, the Mexican government decided to send 800 soldiers under Manuel Gómez Pedraza and the division commanded by General Vicente Guerrero. Both forces restored the provincial order. Once General José Antonio de Echávarri's involvement was discovered, gave his forces to Gómez Pedraza and went to the capital to refine his conduct.
