= Battle of Ixtlahuaca =

1858 battle in the Mexican Reform War

- Part of the Reform War
Date	18 September 1858
Location	Ixtlahuaca, State of México
Result	Liberal victory

Belligerents
Liberals	Conservatives

Commanders and leaders
Manuel Garcia pueblita	Unknown

Strength
10,000 and 10 cannons	8,500 and 4 cannons

Casualties and losses
1,087 killed and 2,000 wounded	4,678 killed and 2,000 captureds

The Battle of Ixtlahuaca, an episode of the Mexican Reform War, took place on 18 September 1858 in the municipality of Ixtlahuaca in the State of Mexico, between liberal and conservative army forces. The victory was won by the liberal side.

The liberal brigadier, Manuel Garcia Pueblita, then commander of the division of Michoacán was near San Felipe del Progreso, when he was notified via military information that a conservative force was garrisoned in the town of Ixtlahuaca. He quickly led his troops to that town, arriving on 18 September 1858 at 10:00 hours. The battle ended at about 13:30 hours.

Pueblita, whose second in command in this action was Colonel Andrés Iturbide, achieved victory and won the square. He retired to Tepetitlán with the Treasury, yielding the town to Benito Juárez.
