= Battle of Agua Zarca =

Military action of the Mexican War of Independence

The Battle of Agua Zarca was a military action of the Mexican War of Independence, carried out on November 5, 1819, in the outskirts of the town of Agua Zarca, Guerrero. The insurgents commanded by General Vicente Guerrero were defeated by the royalist forces; Guerrero, being threatened by the royalist forces that wanted to capture him, managed to save himself by jumping off a cliff and hiding in the mountain range of the present state that bears his name.
