= Capture of Monterrey (1864) =

- Part of the Second French intervention in Mexico
Date	29 August 1864
Location	Monterrey, Nuevo León, Mexico
Result	Mexican Empire victory

Belligerents
(Mexico) Mexican Republicans	(Mexico) Mexican Empire

The Capture of Monterrey took place on 29 August 1864. It was fought between elements of the Mexican republican army and troops of the Second Mexican Empire during the Second French intervention in Mexico.
