= Battle of Celaya (1858) =

Battle of the Mexican Reform War

- Part of the Reform War
Date	8–9 March 1858
Location	Celaya, Guanajuato
Result	Conservative victory

Belligerents
Liberals	Conservatives

Commanders and leaders
Anastasio Parrodi	Luis Osollo

Strength
7,300	5,400

Casualties and losses
405 killed and 1156 wounded	110 killed and 110 wounded

The Battle of Celaya took place on 8 and 9 March 1858 in Celaya (in the state of Guanajuato, Mexico), an early battle of the Reform War. Fought between elements of the liberal army, under General Anastasio Parrodi, governor of Jalisco, and elements of the conservative army, commanded by General Luis G. Osollo. The victory was won by the conservative side and corresponded to the first liberal defeat. The defeat made General Parrodi fell back to Salamanca, where the next battle was fought and won by the conservatives.

The liberal defeat had two main reasons. First, General Moret did not hold the force of cavalry that he commanded since he and other leaders of the liberal coalition forces had little communication. Also, a fire in a carriage park of liberal soldiers contributed to the defeat of their combined forces.
