= First Battle of Agua Prieta =

Part of the Mexican Revolution (1911)

- Part of Mexican Revolution
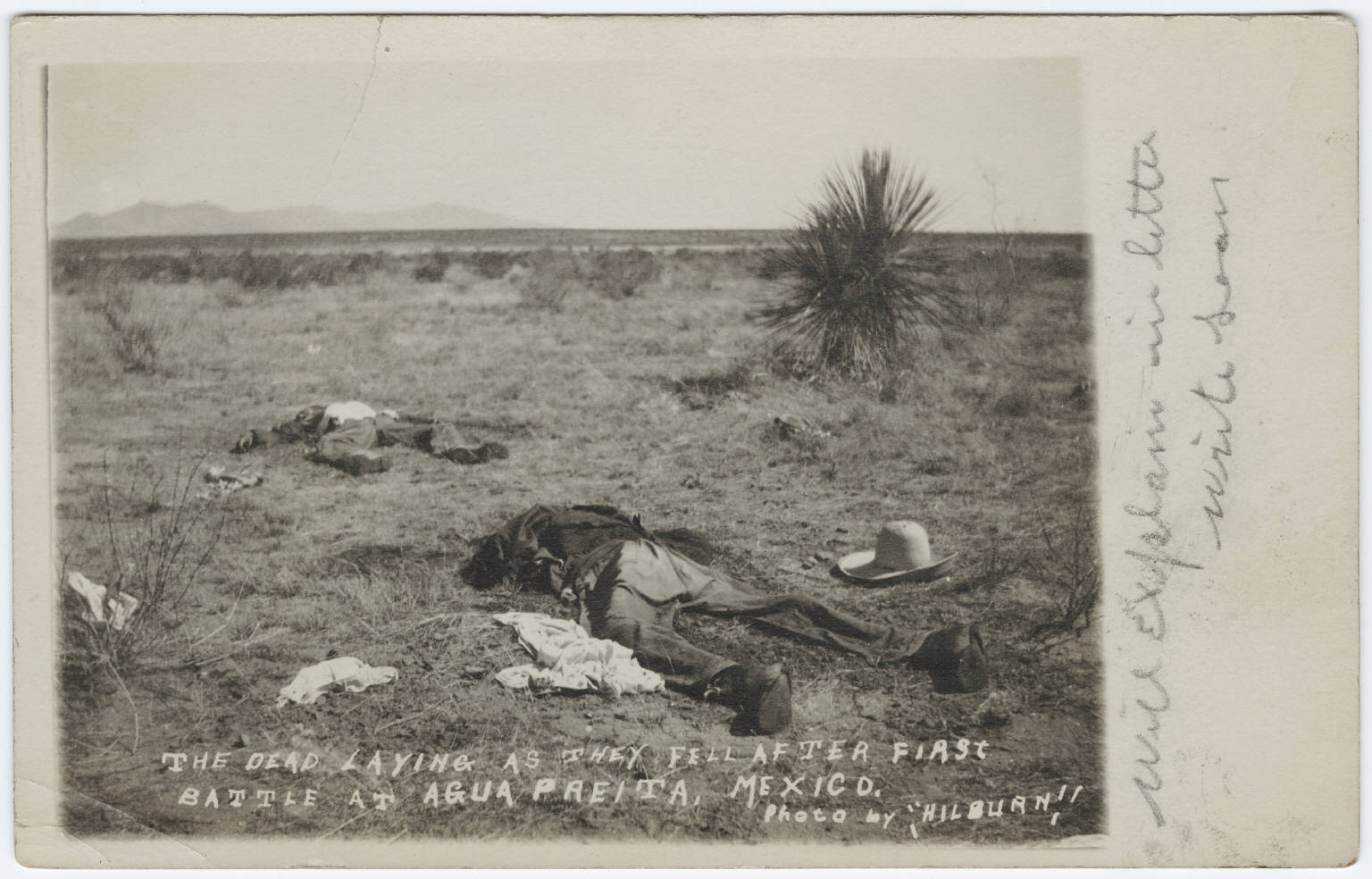
- The dead after the first battle of Agua Prieta
Date	April 1911
Location	Agua Prieta, Sonora
Result	Federalist victory

Belligerents
Constitutionalists United States	Government: Federal Army

The First Battle of Agua Prieta was fought between the supporters of Francisco Madero and federal troops of Porfirio Díaz in April 1911, at Agua Prieta, Sonora, in the initial phase of the Mexican Revolution.

The battle was significant in that it was the first time railroads were used by the rebels to gain surprise and that US forces got involved in the fighting. After United States troops in Douglas, Arizona were attacked by the Federal Army, the Americans responded by intervening in the battle, which allowed the rebels to briefly take control of the town. The town was recaptured by federal troops two weeks later once additional reinforcements arrived. This battle was a turning point in the Mexican revolution.

== See also ==
- Attacks on the United States
