= Expedition of William Walker to Baja California and Sonora =

1853 military expedition

William Walker's Expedition to Baja California and Sonora
- Part of Fillibuster expedition into Mexico
- Flag used by Walker for the unrecognized Republic of Sonora
Date	28 October 1853 – 8 May 1854
Location	Baja California Territory, Mexico
Result	Mexican victory

Belligerents
Mexico; Cucapá; Kiliwa; Paipai	Filibusters

Commanders and leaders
Antonio María Meléndrez	William Walker

Strength
Initial strength: ~20 soldiers Peak strength: ~50 irregulars ~200 Indigenous allies ~100 soldiers	Initial strength: ~45 volunters Peak strength: ~300 volunters

Casualties and losses
Unknown	Unknown

William Walker's expedition to Baja California and Sonora was an unauthorized armed incursion by the American adventurer William Walker and a small force of filibusters into Mexican territory. Motivated by Manifest destiny, personal ambition, and the expansionist politics of the late antebellum United States, Walker tried to seize the sparsely populated Baja California Territory as a base from which to take Sonora and proclaim them an independent republic as a prelude to possible annexation by the United States.

The short-lived entities, the Republic of Lower California and the subsequent Republic of Sonora, never gained international recognition, effective territorial control, or local popular support. Mexican military and civilian resistance, combined with logistical failures and desertions, forced Walker’s surrender in San Diego on 8 May 1854. He was later acquitted in a U.S. court on charges of violating neutrality laws.

== Background ==
Walker, a Tennessee-born physician, lawyer and journalist who had settled in California during the Gold Rush, modeled his plans in part on the earlier Sonora schemes of the French filibuster Gaston de Raousset-Boulbon. In the summer of 1853 he traveled to Guaymas seeking a Mexican colonization grant that he presented as a buffer against Apache raids. The Mexican government, still absorbing the losses of the Mexican Cession, refused.

Back in San Francisco he recruited roughly forty five volunteers, mostly Southern adventurers, and financed the venture in part by selling scrip redeemable in Sonora. California newspapers reported that the organizers had drafted a constitution for a “Republic of Sonora” and issued bonds payable upon annexation to the United States. Walker left on the schooner Caroline, on 16 October 1853. After the 1852 defeat of Raousset-Boulbon, Mexican posts on the Sonora coast were better prepared. Walker therefore shifted his first blow to the Baja California peninsula, intending to use it as a stepping-stone to Sonora.

== Expedition ==
=== Capture of La Paz ===
The Caroline reached Cabo San Lucas and then entered the harbor of La Paz, capital of the Baja California Territory, on 3 November 1853 under the Mexican flag. Walker’s men seized the town and captured the territorial jefe político, Rafael Espinosa. They lowered the Mexican flag and raised a banner of three horizontal stripes, red-white-red, with two stars on the white stripe for Baja California and Sonora. On 3 November Walker proclaimed the “Republic of Lower California” independent of Mexico and named himself president, with his former law partner Henry P. Watkins as vice president and adopting Louisiana’s slaveholding legal code.

The incoming jefe político, Colonel Juan Clímaco Rebolledo, arrived unaware that La Paz had fallen and was also taken prisoner and confined on the Caroline with Espinosa. There was no popular reception of the filibusters, local civilians and militia offered immediate resistance and after a skirmish, Walker re-embarked and abandoned La Paz.

=== Ensenada and Fort McKibbin ===
Walker moved north, closer to the United States border and to the overland approaches to Sonora. On 29 November 1853 his force landed at the Ensenada. They occupied and fortified the adobe house of local ranchero Pedro Gastélum, renaming it Fort McKibbin. From there he issued appeals to American readers for recruits and supplies.

Reinforcements arrived in December on the Anita under Watkins, raising Walker’s strength into the low hundreds The Caroline left Ensenada after negotiations involving the Mexican prisoners and the ship’s officers, cutting Walker off from his original sea transport and from supplies still aboard.

=== Republic of Sonora ===
On 18 January 1854, at Fort McKibbin, Walker issued decrees restyling his claimed territory as the Republic of Sonora, divided into a State of Sonora and a State of Lower California, with himself as president. He still had not occupied Sonora. Bonds and scrip were sold in San Francisco and the flag was displayed there, but the “republic” remained a paper government imposed on a few camps in northern Baja California.

=== Mexican resistance ===
The most effective opposition came from local irregulars. Antonio María Meléndrez, a ranchero from La Grulla, south of Ensenada, raised rancheros and coordinated with Lieutenant Colonel Francisco Javier del Castillo Negrete, military commander on the northern frontier. The two gathered about 58 men and besieged Fort McKibbin from 5 to 14 December 1853. Meléndrez’s bands, which included Cucapá, Kiliwa and Paipai allies, harassed Walker’s camps across several towns, raided livestock and supplies, and shadowed the filibusters on the roads north.

Walker’s men lived off the country. Mexican and regional accounts emphasize looting, requisitions and burned property; filibuster accounts accused Meléndrez of harsh treatment of prisoners.

A Sinaloa column, numbering around 100 men under Colonel José Antonio Ochoa later reached La Paz on 12 December 1853 and helped push Walker from Ensenada to San Vicente.

=== Failed march toward Sonora ===
On 20 March 1854 Walker left a detachment at San Vicente and marched a reduced column to the Colorado River in an attempt to enter Sonora. Heat, lack of water, desertion and attacks on his livestock, including by Indigenous groups along the river and delta, broke the column. He recrossed into Baja California on 6 April with only a fraction of the men who had set out. On his return Meléndrez had already taken San Vicente and scattered the guard left there.

=== Surrender ===
By early May 1854 Walker’s remaining force was short of food, ammunition and mounts. Meléndrez pressed them from the south. Walker and about thirty of his followers crossed into California and surrendered to U.S. Army officers near the border line Meléndrez watching from the Mexican side. Walker refused to lay down his arms to Mexican authority.

== Aftermath ==
Walker and several associates were indicted in San Francisco for waging an illegal war in violation of the Neutrality Act of 1794. In the climate of Manifest Destiny the expedition had popular support in parts of California and the South. A federal jury acquitted Walker. The acquittal left him free to organize the later, larger filibuster in Nicaragua.

The raid did not stop the Gadsden Purchase. James Gadsden’s treaty with Antonio López de Santa Anna was signed on 30 December 1853, while Walker was still in Baja California, and was later ratified. Some writers have argued that the filibuster added to Mexican fears of uncompensated territorial loss or that Walker himself was a U.S. pressure tool.

In the northern peninsula the occupation and the guerrilla war damaged ranches, livestock and the thin frontier population. Meléndrez briefly exercised de facto authority on the frontier after Walker’s flight. On 28 June 1855 he was arrested and shot after a summary proceeding ordered from La Paz.

== See also ==
- Fillibuster
- Gaston de Raousset-Boulbon
- Republic of Baja California
- Republic of Sonora
- Gadsden Purchase
- Filibuster War

== Sources ==
- Bancroft, Hubert Howe. History of the North Mexican States and Texas. Vol. 2. San Francisco: The History Company, 1889.
- Clarke, James Mitchell. "Antonio Melendrez: Nemesis of William Walker in Baja California." California Historical Society Quarterly 12, no. 4 (December 1933)
- Olmeda García, Marina del Pilar. Baja California. Historia de las instituciones jurídicas. Mexico City: Instituto de Investigaciones Jurídicas, UNAM, 2010.
- Woodward, Arthur, ed. The Republic of Lower California, 1853–1854: In the Words of Its State Papers, Eyewitnesses, and Contemporary Reporters. Baja California Travels Series 6. Los Angeles: Dawson's Book Shop, 1966.
- Wyllys, Rufus Kay. "The Republic of Lower California, 1853–1854." Pacific Historical Review 2, no. 2 (June 1933)
