= Rebellion of Guadalajara =

Historic event

1823 Guadalajara Rebellion
Date	1823
Location	Guadalajara, Mexico
Result	Provisional Government victory: Constitution of Colima as Territory of the Nation

Belligerents
Provisional Government of Mexico	Jalisco

Commanders and leaders
Nicolás Bravo; Pedro Celestino Negrete	?

Strength
300	530

Casualties and losses
55	200 captured and 250 between dead and wounded

The Guadalajara rebellion of 1823 was an armed conflict led by the Jalisco government after the fall of the First Mexican Empire and the victory of the Casa Mata Plan Revolution.

== Mutiny and decree ==
When the province of Guadalajara pronounced its independence through its provisional Board in a manifesto in which it opposed the Congress, the municipalities of that territory were exalted to establish a federal republic. As a result of this, on May 12 a tremendous disorder was carried out that attested to the disagreement that still existed among the population, since while some shouted through the streets the return of Iturbide others supported the republic . Such a movement caused the political chief to send some troops to the mutineers, causing bloodshed. Following these events, the Provincial Council decreed:

== Rebellion ==
To all the pronouncements, the Executive Power and the Congress called for the formation of a new Congress that with wider powers constituted the nation under the system of indirect election, assigning a deputy to every 50 000 inhabitants or to the fractions that passed 40 000. With this measure most of the provinces returned to calm, however, Guadalajara was preparing to resist, being necessary the use of military force to reduce the uprising. An expedition commanded by General Nicolás Bravo was arranged and as second to Pedro Celestino Negrete .

== Consequences ==
The expedition was a success, taking General Negrete Colima and getting the entire district back to order, becoming from that moment as the territory of the nation . Bravo, meanwhile, arranged things satisfactorily and returned to Guanajuato in case the circumstances required him to take another point in the country.
