= Rebellion of Oaxaca =

Armed conflict led by the Oaxaca government after the fall of the First Mexican Empire

Rebellion of Oaxaca of 1823
Date	1823
Location	Oaxaca, Mexico
Result	Provisional Government victory

Belligerents
Provisional Government of Mexico	Oaxaca

Commanders and leaders
Unknown	Antonio de León

Strength
400 soldiers and 5 guns	180 soldiers

Casualties and losses
176 between dead and wounded	all the soldiers

The Oaxaca Rebellion of 1823 was an armed conflict led by the Oaxaca government after the fall of the First Mexican Empire and the victory of the revolution of the Casamata Plan.

== Background ==
90% of Oaxacans were indigenous, most of the Spaniards and mestizos lived in Oaxaca City.

For the great merchants who supported the independence of Oaxaca from the town hall, it was the economic nature, because in 1822, due to the precarious national economy, the imperial government demanded a contribution of more than 200,000 thousand pesos. That is, the main actors during the independence movement were army officers, militias and representatives of the town hall based in Antequera.

=== Call for unity ===
In Oaxaca, despite the fact that the executive branch and the Congress called for the formation of a new Congress with more broad powers that constituted the nation under the indirect election system, assigning a deputy to every 50 000 inhabitants or to the fractions that After 40,000, the latter was not well received. During the War Board in Oaxaca, 72 people participated, of which few were from the Army and militias, predominantly General Antonio de León.

== Rebellion ==
With this measure most of the provinces returned to calm, however, the Oaxaca government returned the call decreed in accordance with general opinion and decreed a provincial government, the people rose in arms and proclaimed their independence from Mexico as "Free and Federal State of Oaxaca". For this reason, the provisional government decided to resort to military force to quell the uprising as was done with the Guadalajara Rebellion, achieving calm after its taking.

== Aftermath ==
The draft declaration of independence supported by merchants was not distinguished by its liberal characteristics, but the struggle to achieve what they had been seeking since the introduction of the intendancies in 1786. Independence would mean the return to the powerful position they held before senior Crown officials came to control the Oaxaca province.
