= Revolt of Querétaro =

Revolt of Querétaro of 1823
- Part of the Casa Mata Plan Revolution
Date	12 December 1823
Location	Queretaro, Mexico
Result	Provisional Government victory

Belligerents
Provisional Government of Mexico	Imperialists

Commanders and leaders
Nicolás Bravo; José Joaquín Calvo	Unknown

Strength
1,200	2,000

Casualties and losses
100 wounded or dead	500 captured and 100 dead

The Revolt of Querétaro was an armed conflict fought in 1823 and waged by the Imperialist faction after the fall of the First Mexican Empire and the victory of the Casa Mata Plan Revolution.

== Revolt ==
On 12 December 1823, the 8th Regiment based in Santiago de Querétaro conducted a military rebellion led by a Spanish sergeant and an Andalusian from Cádiz, who arrested commander José Joaquín Calvo and other provisional authorities. They then seized the park and weapons and prepared to seize more territory outside the city.

== Response ==
General Nicolás Bravo, who after the Guadalajara rebellion, left with his forces for Guanajuato to act if needed, was in Celaya. He soon introduced himself to his forces and suppressed the rebels. With the approval of the government, he then disbanded the regiment and arrested the leader of the rebellion.
