= First Magdalena massacre =

- Location: Magdalena de Kino, Sonora, New Spain; Modern Day: Magdalena de Kino, Sonora, Mexico
- Date: November 3, 1757
- Attack type: Mass murder
- Deaths: 31
- Injuries: Unknown
- Perpetrator: Seri

The First Magdalena massacre was an attack by Indigenous Seri people against the Spanish mission village of Magdalena de Kino, in the present day northern Mexico. The attack occurred on November 3, 1757 and was the first of two massacres at the town. The second attack came almost exactly nineteen years later in November, 1776. Not much is known except for the deaths of thirty-one men, women and children, as well as Jesuit missionaries.

== See also ==
- Capture of Tucson (1846)
- Capture of Tucson (1862)
- American Indian Wars
- Apache Wars
- Navajo Wars
