= Battle of Rellano =

Battle of Rellano may refer to:

- First Battle of Rellano, a battle of the Mexican Revolution at Rellano, Chihuahua
- Second Battle of Rellano, a battle of the Mexican Revolution at the same location
