= Treaty of Ciudad Juárez =

1911 treaty during the Mexican Revolution

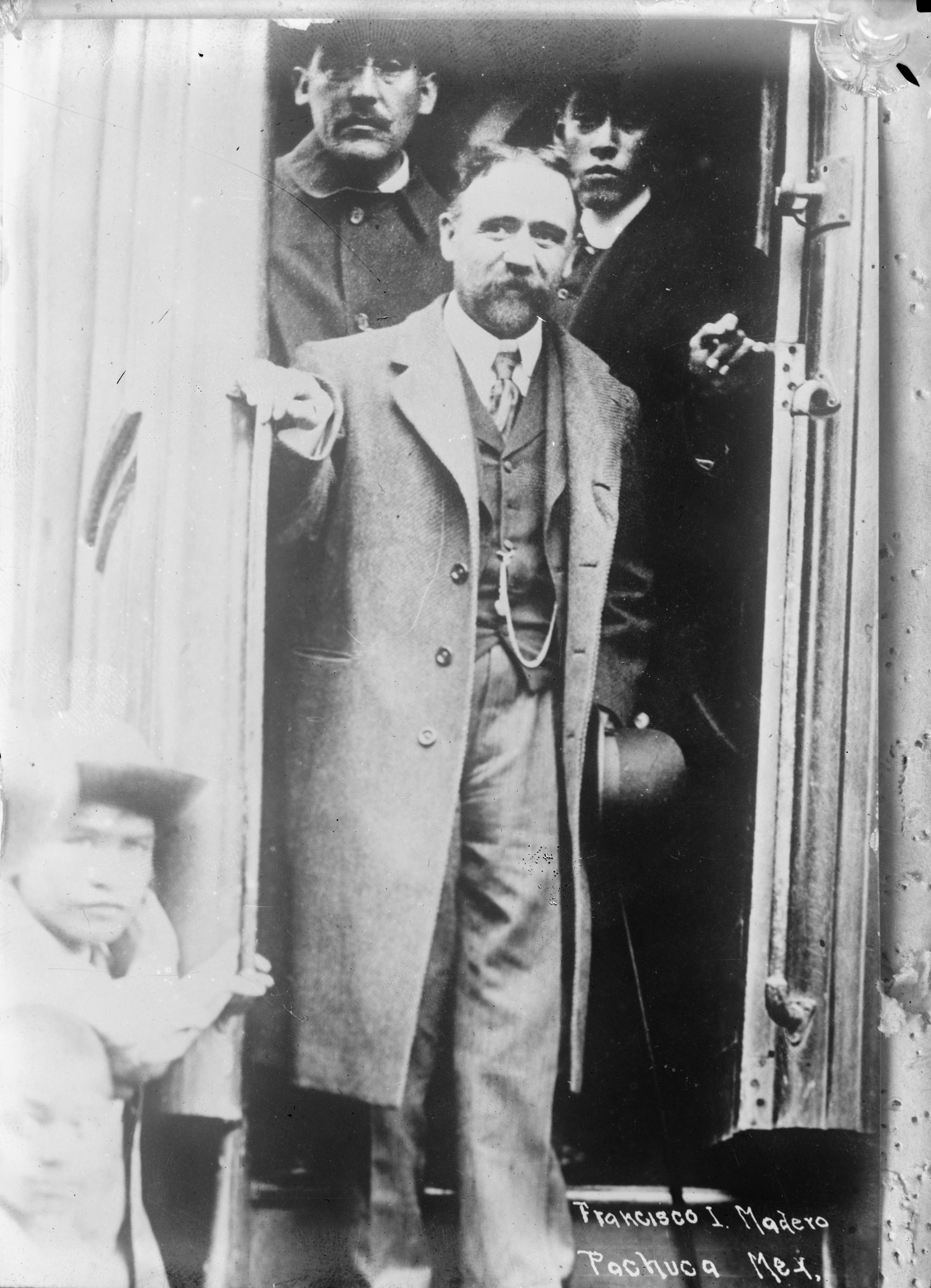
Francisco Madero arriving in Pachuca in 1912

The Treaty of Ciudad Juárez was a peace treaty signed between the President of Mexico, Porfirio Díaz, and the revolutionary Francisco Madero on May 21, 1911. The treaty put an end to the fighting between forces supporting Madero and those of Díaz and thus concluded the initial phase of the Mexican Revolution.

The treaty stipulated that Díaz, as well as his vice president Ramón Corral, were to step down by the end of May, and that he was to be replaced by Francisco León de la Barra as interim president and hold presidential elections. Those who had suffered losses due to the revolution would be indemnified, and there would be a general amnesty. Díaz resigned on May 25, and interim president Francisco León de la Barra was the new incumbent. Díaz and his family, his vice president Corral, plus José Yves Limantour and Rosendo Pineda left Mexico for exile.

Significantly, the treaty did not mention or institute any social reforms that Madero had vaguely promised on previous occasions. It also left the Porfirian state essentially intact. Additionally, Madero supported the unpopular idea that all land disputes were to be settled through the courts, staffed by the old judges, a decision that led to outbreaks of sporadic violence, particularly in rural areas.

On June 7, 1911, Madero entered Mexico City. In October 1911 he was elected president, under the banner of the Partido Constitucional Progresista, along with José María Pino Suárez, his new running mate as vice-president. Madero pushed aside Francisco Vázquez Gómez, the vice presidential candidate for the Anti-Reelectionist Party in 1910, as being too moderate.

== Military developments leading up to the treaty ==
The rebellion against the government of Porfirio Díaz broke out in late 1910, after Díaz had rival Francisco I. Madero imprisoned and had announced his own victory in a falsified election. Madero's earlier vague promises of agrarian reforms had attracted many supporters. He himself escaped from prison and fled to Texas, from where he issued his famous Plan of San Luis Potosí. This manifesto called for an armed uprising against the Porfiriato and establishment of free and democratic elections. As a response to Madero's proclamation, violent clashes began throughout Mexico in November 1910.

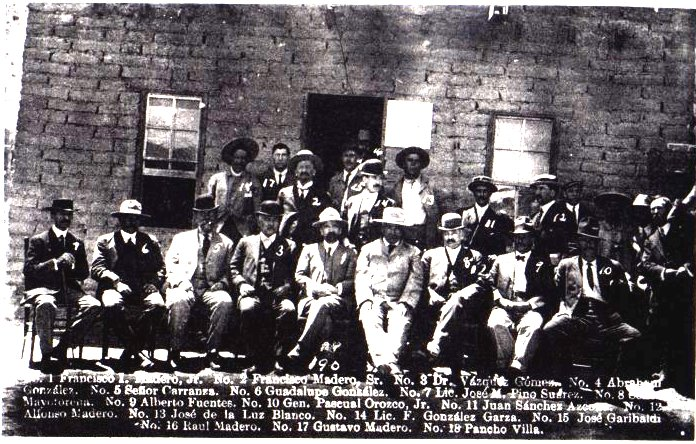
Official photograph of the victors of the Battle of Ciudad Juárez. Madero is seated in center, Orozco on the far right and Villa is standing on the far left.

In the Guerrero district of Chihuahua, Pascual Orozco attacked federal troops and sent dead soldiers' clothing back to Díaz with the message, "Ahí te van las hojas, mándame más tamales" ("Here are the wrappers, send me more tamales.") He then began operations that threatened Ciudad Juárez. Additionally, political support for Madero's rebellion came from Gov. Abraham González, who accepted the Plan of San Luis Potosí.

At roughly the same time, agrarian unrest in the state of Morelos turned into a full-blown rebellion under the leadership of the Zapata brothers, Emiliano and Eufemio.

=== Orozco and Villa take Ciudad Juárez ===
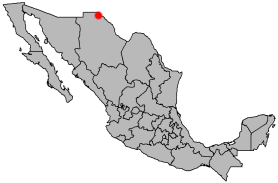
Ciudad Juárez lies on the border between Mexico and the United States. Its location played a significant role in the battle for the city and concerns that the US might intervene delayed Madero's and the rebels' attack.

Encouraged by the news of the uprisings, Madero crossed the border back into Mexico in February 1911. He was joined by Pancho Villa and Orozco and in April the army began approaching Ciudad Juárez. Orozco and Villa led the way with 500 men each, while Madero followed up with 1,500 riders. The city was besieged by the end of the month, after Madero's army encountered some resistance in the Chihuahuan countryside. Madero asked the commander of the city's garrison to surrender but the latter refused, hoping that the fortifications he had constructed would allow him to defend the city until reinforcements arrived. Concerned also with the possibility that a direct attack on the town would cause artillery shells to cross the border into the United States, which could provoke an outside intervention, and faced with a series of peace proposals from Díaz, Madero hesitated in attacking the city. He in fact ordered his commanders to lift the siege. Orozco, however disregarded the order and, joined by Villa, attacked. After two days of fighting the city fell to the insurrectionists. Madero intervened personally to spare the life of the city's commander, Gen. Navarro, whom both Orozco and Villa wanted executed for his previous killing of rebel POWs. This, coupled with the fact that both leaders were ignored by Madero in his political appointments, outraged and estranged them from him.

=== Zapata in south and central Mexico ===
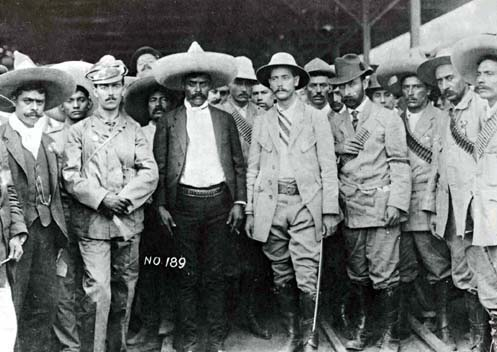
Emiliano Zapata and his staff together with Gen. Manuel Asúnsolo and revolutionary Gov. Abraham González in Cuernavaca in April 1911.

At about the same time that Villa and Orozco were marching on Ciudad Juárez, the Zapatista revolt gathered strength and spread to the states of Puebla, Tlaxcala, Mexico, Michoacán and Guerrero. On April 14 Madero had Emiliano Zapata officially designated as his representative in the region. However, Zapata was worried that if he did not fully control all the major towns in Morelos by the time Madero concluded negotiations with Díaz, the demands of his agrarian movement and the issue of the autonomy of Morelos would be ignored or sidelined. Zapata's first military action was to take the town of Chinameca, where he obtained essential supplies. Subsequently, Zapata, for political and strategic reasons, decided to attack the city of Cuautla. In order to mislead his opponents, however, he initially attacked and captured the towns of Izúcar de Matamoros (which was subsequently retaken by federal forces) and Chietla. From there he made a wide circle around Cuautla and captured Yautepec and Jonacatepec, where he gathered more supplies, munitions and soldiers. By May, out of all the major urban centers in the region, only Cuautla and the capital of Morelos, Cuernavaca, remained outside his control.

Zapata began the attack on Cuautla on May 13 with 4000 troops against 400 elite soldiers of the so-called "Golden Fifth"; the Fifth Cavalry Regiment of the Federal Army. The battle took almost a week and has been described as "six of the most terrible days of battle in the whole Revolution". It consisted of house-to-house fighting, hand-to-hand combat and no quarter given by either side. Gen. Victoriano Huerta arrived in nearby Cuernavaca with 600 reinforcements but decided not to come to the relief of Cuautla, as he was afraid that the capital would revolt in his absence. On May 19 the remains of the "Golden Fifth" pulled out of the town, which was then occupied by Zapata's soldiers.

The successful capture of Cuautla made Zapata a hero to ordinary people throughout Mexico and new corridos were written about him. After Zapata's taking of Cuautla the federal government controlled only five states and some urban areas. Porfirio Díaz himself later stated that, while he felt he could defend against Villa and Orozco in Chihuahua, the fall of Cuautla was the event that persuaded him to agree to peace with Madero.

== Compromise ==
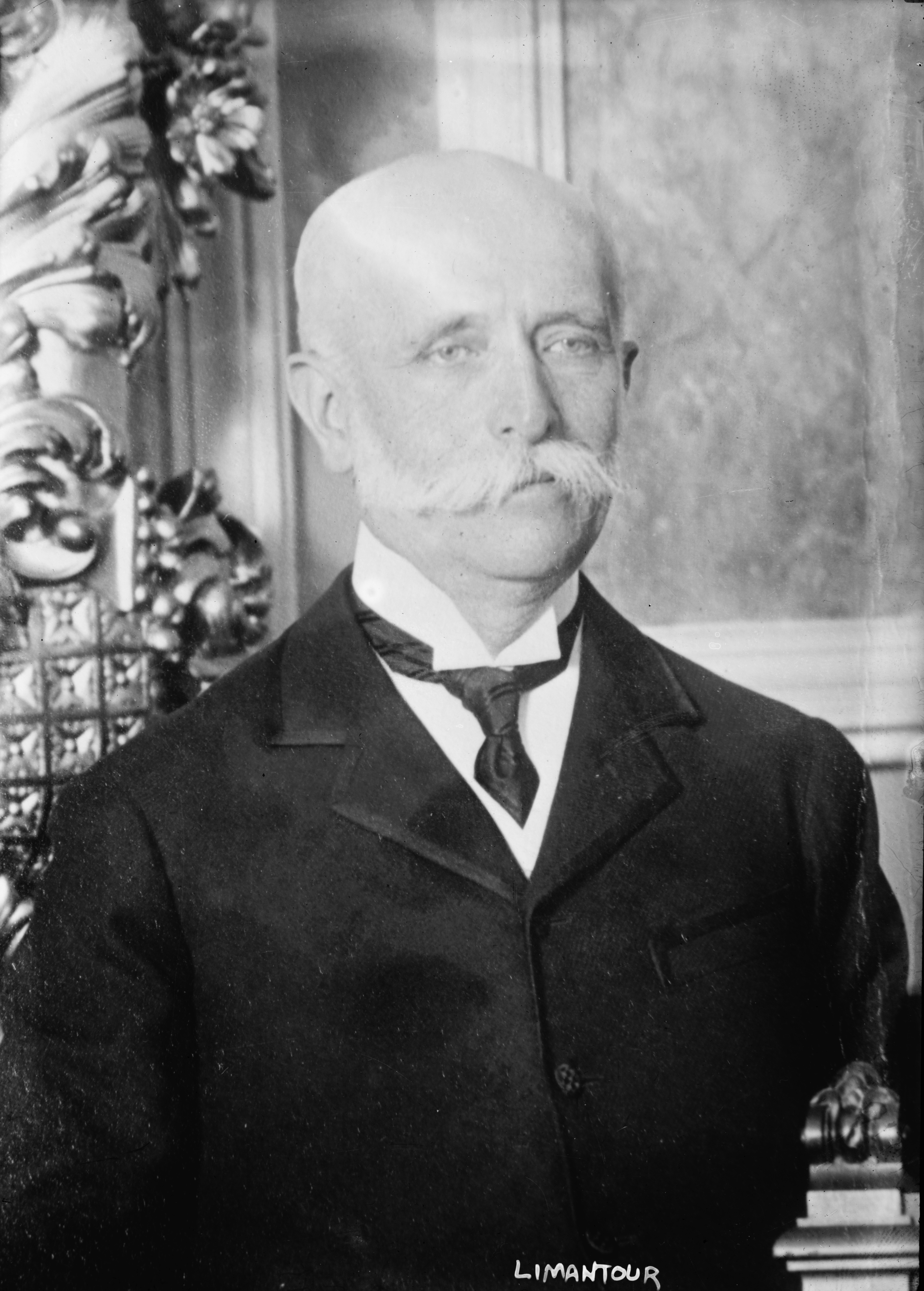
José Yves Limantour, Díaz's advisor who encouraged him to step down from the Presidency.

As early as March 1911 Madero's representatives met in New York with Díaz's finance minister, José Yves Limantour, and the Mexican ambassador to the US in order to discuss the possibility of peace between the two sides. Limantour proposed an end to hostilities and offered an amnesty for all revolutionaries, the resignation of the then-vice president Ramón Corral, the replacement of four Díaz cabinet ministers and ten state governors by ones chosen by Madero and the establishment of the principle of "no-reelection", which would prevent Díaz from seeking yet another term as president (which would have been his ninth). Madero responded positively, although he also stated that any kind of peace deal had to include an immediate resignation by Díaz.

Faced with the siege of Ciudad Juárez and the outbreak of rebellion in Morelos, Díaz and members of his cabinet became more willing to negotiate and launched a "skillful peace offensive" aimed at Madero. This was largely a result of panic among the large landowners associated with the Díaz regime (the hacendados) and the financial elite, which represented a "moderate" wing within the government. Some among the Porfiristas, in fact, expected that Zapata would soon march on Mexico City itself, unless peace was concluded with Madero.

The moderate view within the Díaz government was represented by Jorge Vera Estañol, who in a memo to the minister of foreign affairs wrote that there were two revolutions taking place in Mexico: a political revolution, based mostly in the north whose main aim was to establish free elections and remove Díaz himself from power, and a social revolution whose aim was "anarchy", which was spreading throughout the countryside. Estañol recommended coming to terms with the first group of revolutionaries by agreeing to the principle of no re-election and a general amnesty, in order to prevent the second group from succeeding. In addition to his fear of "anarchy", Estañol was also worried that the social revolution would lead to a military intervention by the United States.

Estañol's views represented those of the portion of the upper class which was willing to come to terms with at least a portion of the middle class in order to crush the peasant uprisings, as exemplified by those of Zapata, which were erupting throughout Mexico. Limantour, who broadly agreed with Estañol, had the support of the Mexican financiers, who feared the downgrading of Mexican international credit and a general economic crisis as a result of ongoing social unrest, as well as that of the large landowners who were willing to come to terms with Madero if it would put an end to the agrarian uprisings.

These social group were in turn opposed by the more reactionary elements within Díaz's government, mostly concentrated in the Federal Army, who thought that the rebels should be dealt with through brute force. This faction was represented by Gen. Victoriano Huerta, who would later carry out an attempted coup d'état against Madero. Likewise, Gen.--and potential successor to Díaz--Bernardo Reyes stated in a letter to Limantour that "the repression [against the insurrectionists] should be carried out with the greatest energy, punishing without any pity anyone participating in the armed struggle". In the end, however, Díaz dismissed the advice from his generals as "Custer-like bluster" and chose to seek peace with the moderate wing of the revolution. Limantour had finally managed to persuade him to resign.

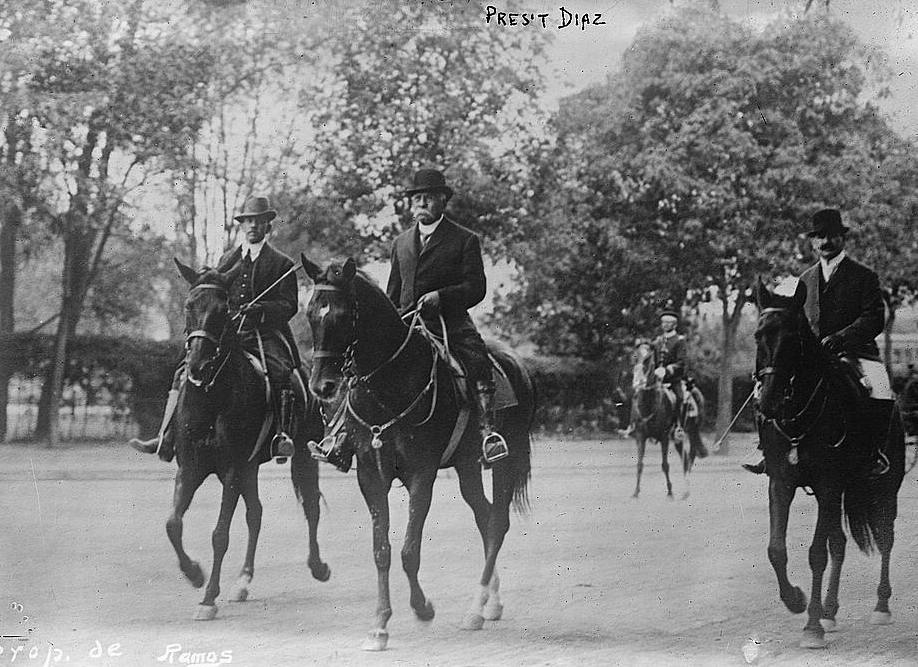
Porfirio Díaz on horseback in 1910 or 1911.

At the same time there was also disagreement among the rebels. The "left wing" of the revolutionary movement, represented by Zapata and Orozco (Villa, for the time being, tended to support Madero), warned against any possible compromises with Díaz. In the end their suspicions proved correct, as the treaty that was eventually signed neglected issues of social and agrarian land reform that were central to their struggle.

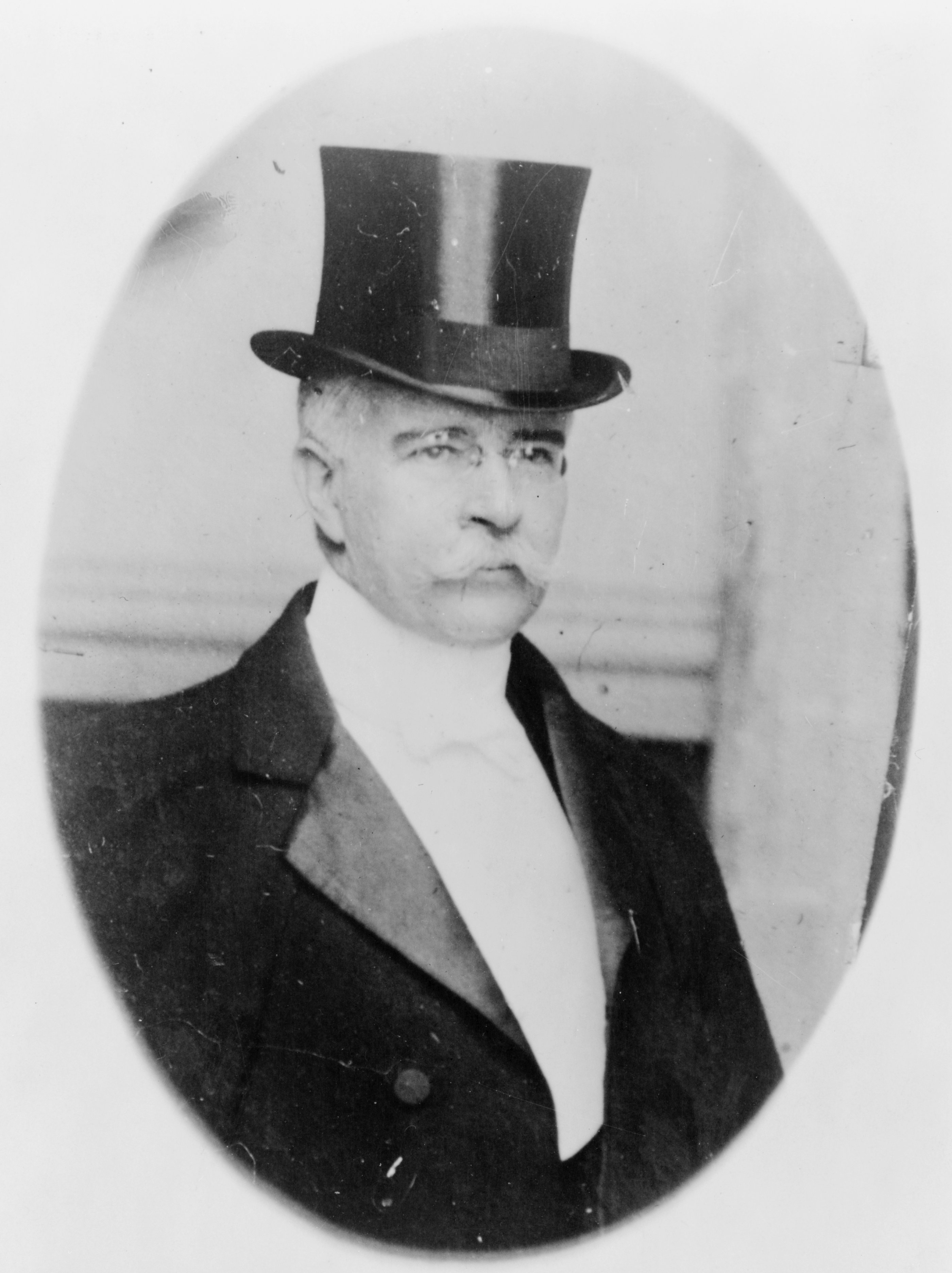
Interim president Francisco León de la Barra.

== Treaty's terms ==
The most significant point of the treaty was that Porfirio Díaz, and his vice president, Ramón Corral, resign and that Francisco León de la Barra, acting as Interim President, organize free elections as soon as possible.

Additionally, the treaty stipulated that:

1. An amnesty for all revolutionaries be declared, with the option for some of them to apply for membership in the rurales.
2. The revolutionary forces were to be demobilized as soon as possible and the federal forces were to be the only army in Mexico. This was in order to appease the army, which had opposed a compromise with Madero.
3. Madero and his supporters had the right to name 14 provisional state governors and to approve De la Barra's cabinet.
4. Pensions were to be established for relatives of soldiers who had died fighting the rebels.
5. Policemen and judges, as well as state legislators, that had been appointed or "elected" under Díaz were to retain their offices.

== Implementation and results ==
The treaty was signed on May 21. Díaz resigned accordingly on May 25. Francisco de la Barra became the interim president. Madero entered Mexico City on June 7.

Zapata, however, refused to recognize the interim government of de la Barra, and for the time being the fighting in Morelos continued. Madero met with Zapata on several occasions during June. While initially Zapata trusted Madero, with time he became increasingly concerned that the goals of "his revolution" were not being fulfilled. He was particularly angry that Madero did not plan on carrying out any kind of agrarian reform, or the breakup of large haciendas. Additionally, the press in Mexico City--controlled by the landowners--began referring to Zapata as a bandit and federal generals, such as Huerta, continued attacking his troops under the pretext that Zapata failed to demobilize in violation of the treaty. Sporadic fighting in southern Mexico continued. In November 1911, shortly after Madero's inauguration, Zapata issued the famous Plan of Ayala, in which the Zapatistas denounced Madero and instead recognized Pascual Orozco as the rightful president and leader of the revolution.

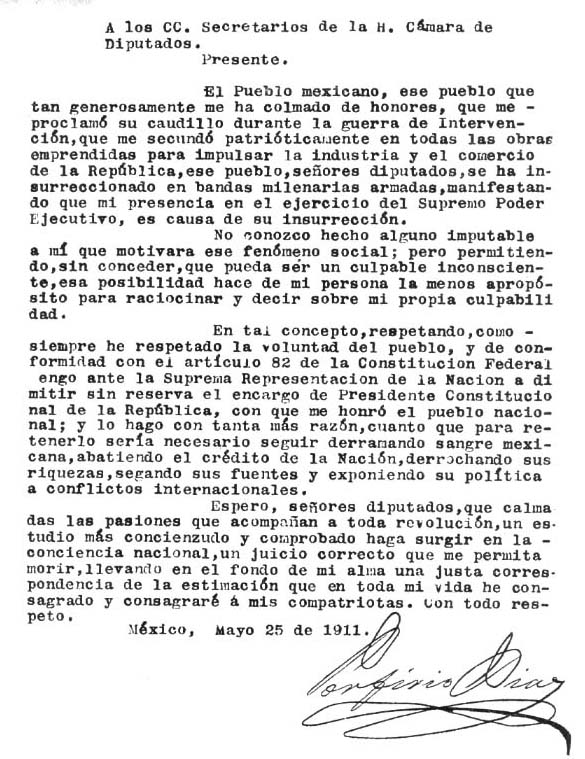
Porfirio Díaz's letter of resignation.

Madero also incurred the great displeasure of other revolutionaries, including Pascual Orozco. Madero's first act after the treaty was signed was a gesture of reconciliation with the Díaz regime. As a result of the treaty he was given the right to appoint members of the la Barra cabinet. He chose mostly upper-class Maderistas, including his wife for the post in the treasury. He also maintained the existing federal system by keeping the sitting judges of the Supreme Court, the legislators in federal and state assemblies and the bureaucrats of the various federal agencies. Venustiano Carranza, who was going to become a major revolutionary in his own right and a future president of Mexico, stated that, after the treaty, Madero had "deliver[ed] to the reactionaries a dead revolution which will have to be fought over again". Díaz, after leaving for exile in France, observed that "Madero has unleashed a tiger, let us see if he can control him".

Orozco, who saw himself as being instrumental in Madero's victory over Díaz, was merely appointed a commander of the rurales in Chihuahua, which increased his resentment. When he tried to run for governor of the state, Madero supported his opponent, Abraham González, and eventually pressured Orozco to drop out of the race. When, in the aftermath of the Plan of Ayala, Madero ordered Orozco to lead federal troops to suppress Zapata, Orozco refused. In March 1912 Orozco issued his Plan of Empacadora and formally declared himself in rebellion against Madero.
