= First Battle of Rellano =

- Part of the Mexican Revolution
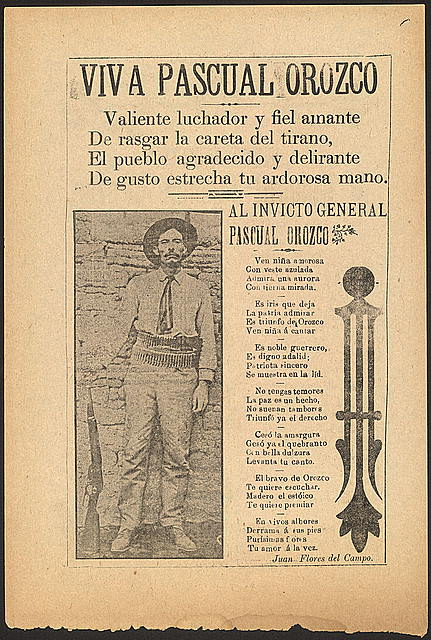
- A corrido extolling Pascual Orozco, the leader of the rebel army and commander at Rellano
Date	24 March 1912
Location	Rellano, Chihuahua
Result	Rebel (Orozco's) victory

Belligerents
Orozquistas	Government: División del Norte

Commanders and leaders
Pascual Orozco	José González Salas †

Strength
6,000–7,000	6,000–7,150

Casualties and losses
200	600

The First Battle of Rellano was an engagement on 24 March 1912 during the Mexican Revolution at the Rellano railroad station, in the state of Chihuahua. It was fought between government troops loyal to Francisco I. Madero, led by General José González Salas, and rebel troops under Pascual Orozco. The battle was a victory for Orozco.

== Background ==
While initially an enthusiastic opponent of Porfirio Díaz's dictatorship of Mexico, Pascual Orozco began coming into conflict with Francisco Madero and other revolutionary leaders as early as Battle of Ciudad Juárez. Orozco was resentful over Madero's appointment of Venustiano Carranza, rather than himself, as defense minister. Furthermore, over the course of 1911 Orozco began courting the support of the powerful Chihuahuan Terrazas family who were sworn enemies of Pancho Villa. This led to a break between Villa and Orozco. The final straw came when Madero appointed Abraham González, Villa's mentor, as governor of Chihuahua. In March 1912 Orozco decreed a formal revolt against Madero's government.

== The battle ==
General José González Salas was sent from Mexico City in an expedition against Orozco on March 8. He set up his headquarters in Torreón, Coahuila, with a view of quelling Orozco's uprising in middle of March. On March 18 he led 6000 men into Chihuahua. Progress was slow because the troops were forced to repair railroad tracks and bridges that had been blown up by the rebels along the way. Furthermore, González split his force into three columns. A cavalry column under Trucy Aubuert was sent ahead to scout but soon lost communication with the main force. González then sent another unit of cavalry under Joaquín Téllez to continue the scouting. The two cavalry units and the infantry and artillery under González were all supposed to converge together in Ciudad Jiménez. However, the second scouting force also got detached from the main force. As a result, the colorados, as Orozco's troops were known because of their red flag, managed to surprise Salas' federal troops at the southern edge of the Bolsón de Mapimí region. However, the first few hours of fighting involved minor skirmishes and proved indecisive. Eventually, the rebel forces retreated to Rellano where, along with newly arrived reinforcements, they dug in. By this point, Orozco had about 3000 men; González's men continued to proceed by rail.

At that point, Orozco's co-conspirator, Emilio Campa, loaded a locomotive with dynamite and sent it at the federal troops which were moving by rail. Later, the tactic of using explosive-laden trains became known as the loco loco (crazy locomotive) or the máquina loca (crazy machine). Despite the fact that Salas' troops, upon seeing an incoming train, had taken the precaution of removing some of the rails, the speed of the locomotive was fast enough so that it jumped the missing rails, crashed into Orozco's train and exploded. The casualties, however, were fairly low as a good portion of the infantry had disembarked when they saw the locomotive approaching.

The soldiers who had been on the train began moving north when they were ambushed by about 1000 Orozquistas troops firing upon them from the surrounding hills. A cavalry squadron under General Aureliano Blanquet attempted to encircle the rebels but had to retreat when more of them arrived. The sound of the battle alerted Téllez's cavalry unit which soon arrived on the scene. The federal troops made a fighting retreat towards Torreón, with Téllez fighting a rear guard action, and once again becoming separated from the bulk of Gonzalez's soldiers.

After arriving in Torreon, González waited a day and a half for news of what had happened to Téllez's cavalry, or to the men under Aubuert (who, unknown to González, managed to reach Jiménez unharmed). With none arriving, he grew desperate and committed suicide.

The battle was a victory for Orozco, although in purely military terms it was only a minor setback for the federal forces, most of which remained intact and combat ready. However, Orozco effectively used the news of the engagement for propaganda purposes, which with the spectacular tactic of the dynamite filled locomotive and González's suicide contributed to the general perception of a military disaster for Madero's supporters.

== Aftermath ==
Orozco's victory at the first battle of Rellano marked the high point of his rebellion. He was in control of all of Chihuahua except for the town of Parral which was garrisoned by Pancho Villa's troops. Villa had remained loyal to Madero during the rebellion, partly because of his respect for the Madero-appointed governor of Chihuahua Abraham González, and partly due to his own personal rivalry with Orozco. Attacking Parral was the next logical step for Orozco. In the ensuing battle Orozco eventually took the town, but Villa's stubborn resistance bought enough time for General Victoriano Huerta to arrive in Chihuahua with a new federal army. At the Second Battle of Rellano fortunes turned and Huerta defeated Orozco (who attempted to use a variation on the loco loco trick which had worked for him before). Subsequently, the rebellion collapsed and Orozco was forced to seek safety in the United States.
