= Cuautla =

Cuautla may refer to:

- Cuautla, Jalisco, Mexico
- Cuautla, Morelos, Mexico
  - Cuautla FC, the football club of Cuautla, Morelos
  - Siege of Cuautla, 1812
  - Battle of Cuautla (1911)
