= 1911 Mexican general election =

- 1 and 15 October 1911
- Presidential election
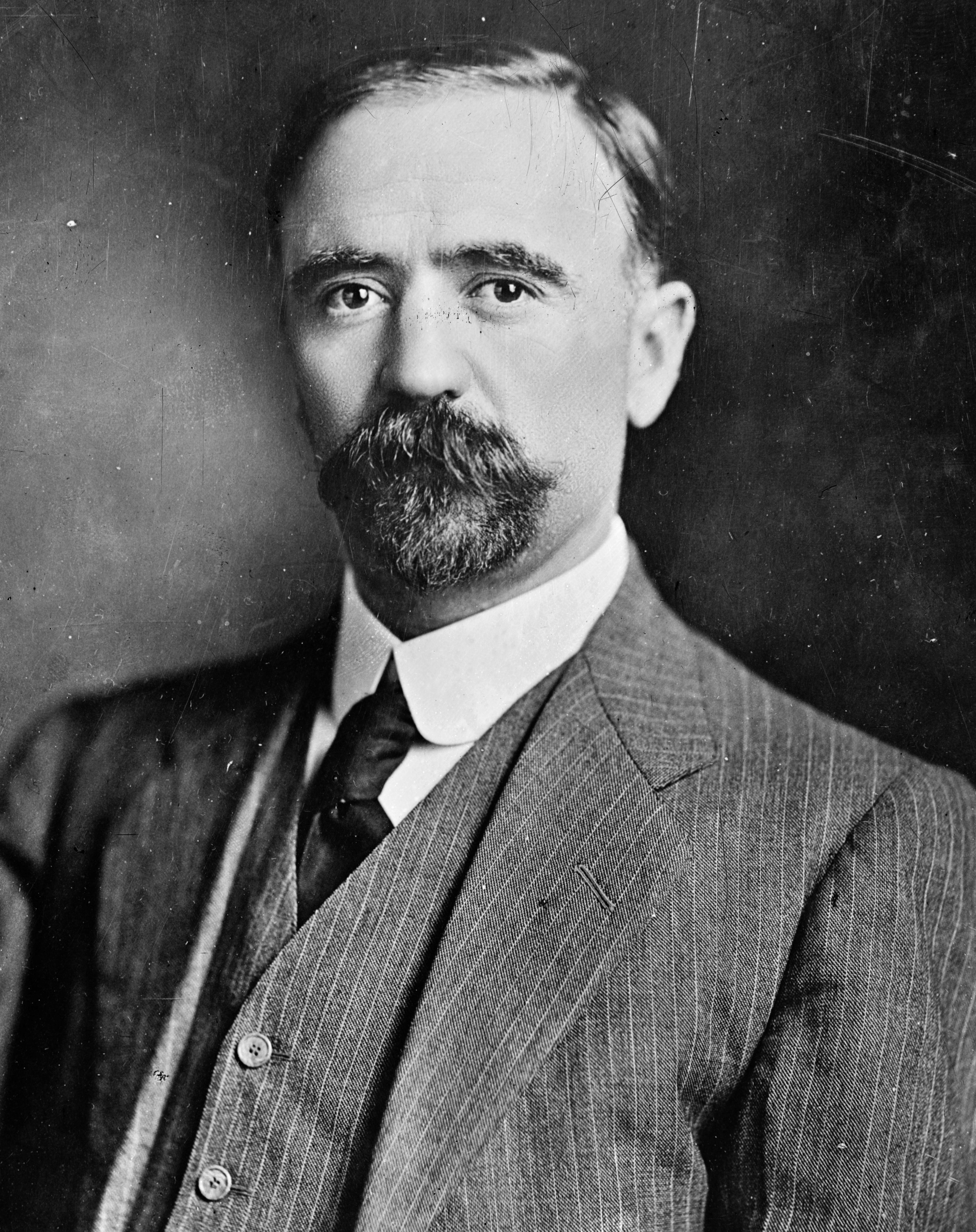

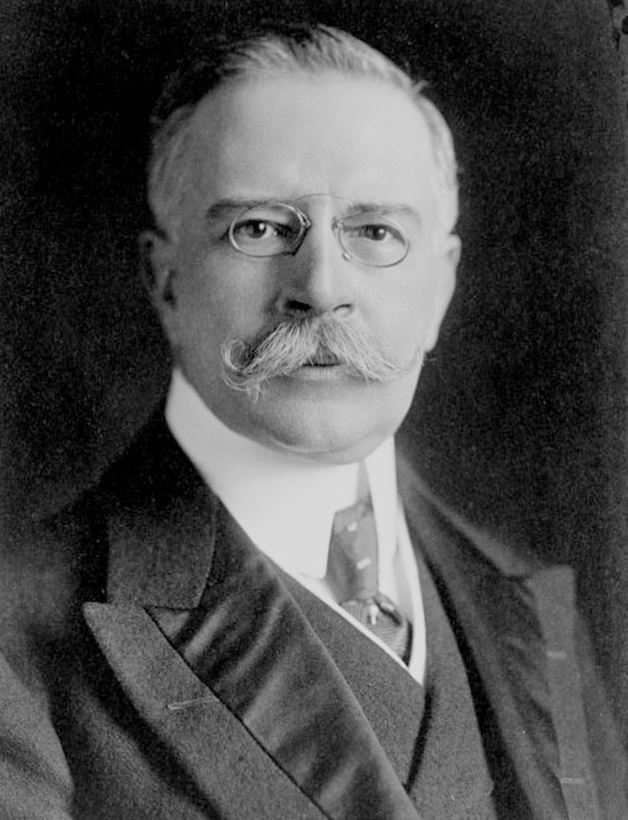
Nominee	Francisco I. Madero	Francisco León de la Barra
Party	Progressive Constitutionalist	Independent
Popular vote	19,997	87
Percentage	99.27%	0.43%
President before election
Francisco León de la Barra
Independent
Elected President
Francisco I. Madero
Progressive Constitutionalist

General elections were held in Mexico on 1 and 15 October 1911.

== Background ==
The 1910 elections were intended to be the first free elections of the Porfiriato, but after opposition leader Francisco I. Madero appeared poised to upset the Porfirian regime, he was arrested and imprisoned before the election was held. Despite Madero's popularity, Diaz was controversially announced as the election winner with almost 99% of the votes. The elections were subsequently rigged and the results not recognized by Madero, who then published the Plan of San Luis Potosí in October 1910 that served to incite the Mexican Revolution.

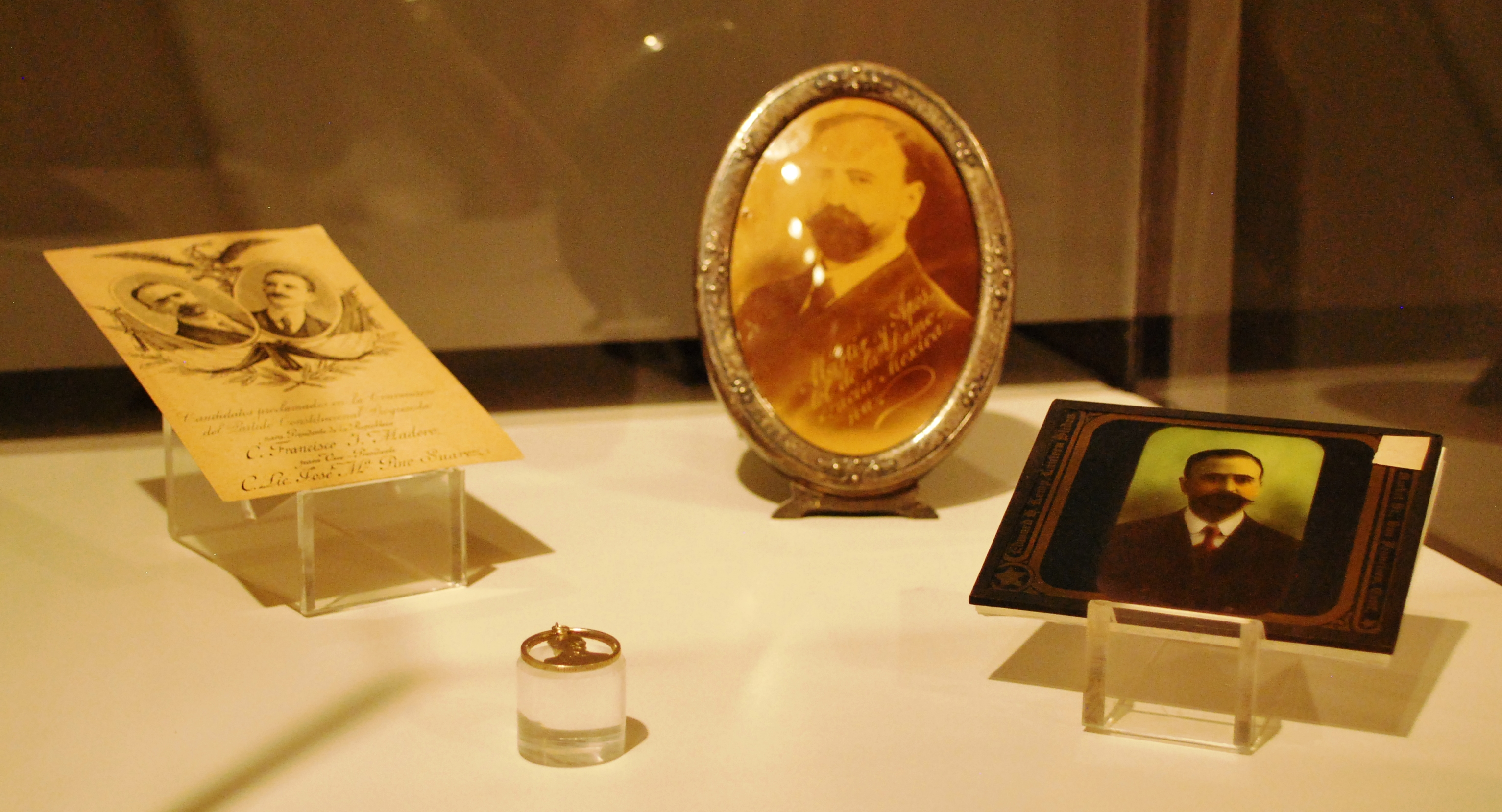
Items from the Madero-Pino Suárez campaign.

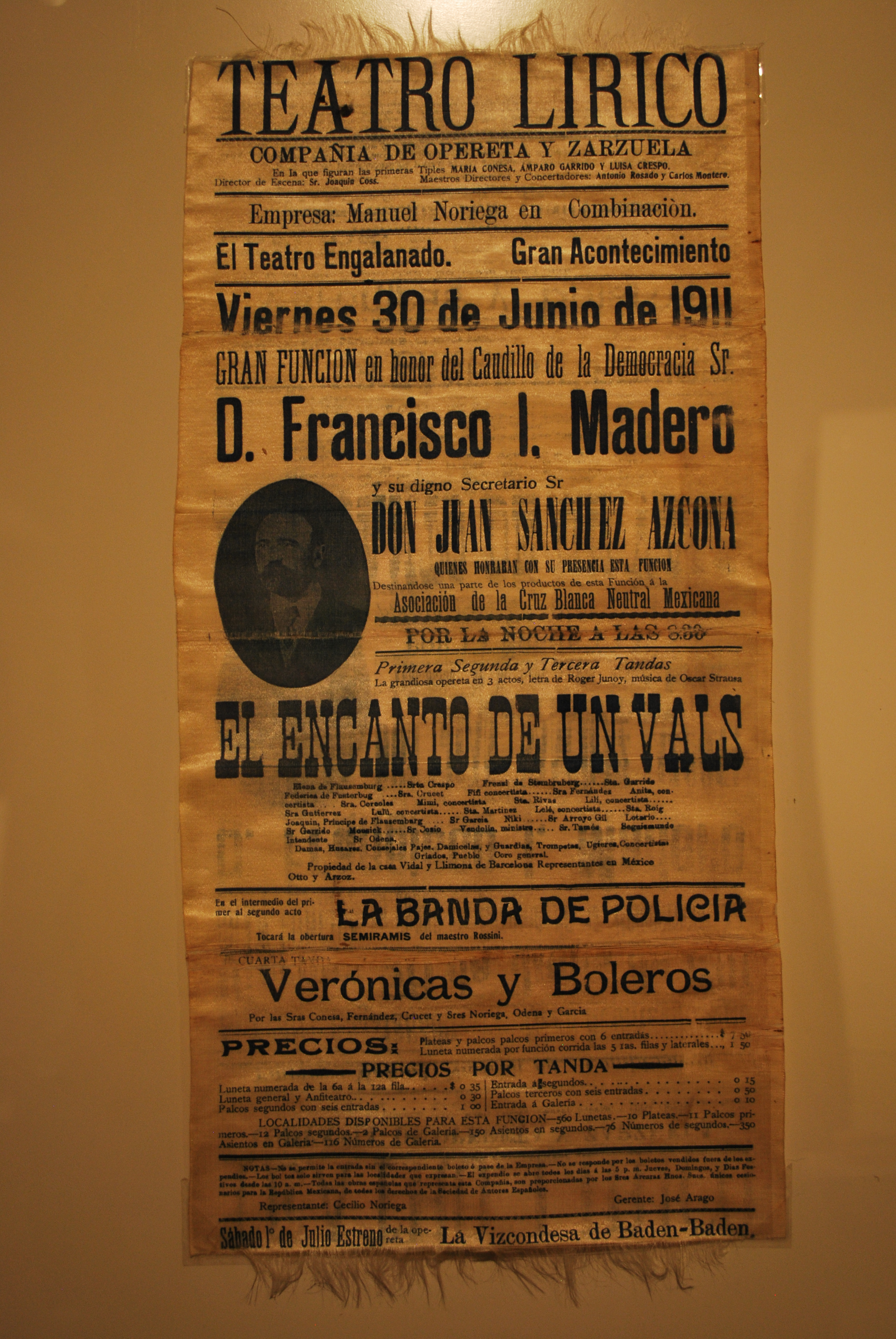
Poster for a Madero rally.

== Results ==
=== President ===
Candidate	Votes	%
Francisco I. Madero	19,997	99.27
Francisco León de la Barra	87	0.43
Emilio Vázquez Gómez	16	0.08
Other candidates	45	0.22
Total	20,145	100.00
Source: González Casanova

=== Vice-President ===
Candidate	Votes	%
José María Pino Suárez	10,245	63.90
Francisco León de la Barra	5,564	34.70
Fernando Iglesias Calderón	173	1.08
Other candidates	51	0.32
Total	16,033	100.00
Source: González Casanova
