= José González Salas =

Mexican Army general (1862–1912)

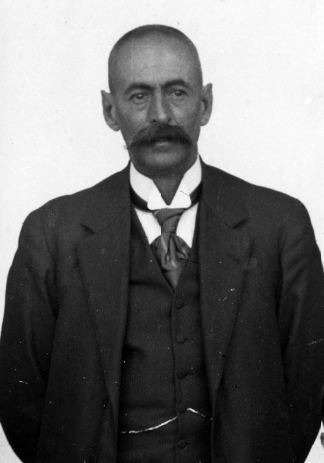

Secretary of War and Navy of Mexico
- In office July 3, 1911 – October 30, 1911
- President: Francisco León de la Barra
- Vice President: Jose Maria Pino Suarez
- Preceded by: Eugenio Rascón
- Succeeded by: Manuel M. Plata
- In office November 6, 1911 – March 5, 1912
- President: Francisco I. Madero
- Vice President: Jose Maria Pino Suarez
- Preceded by: Manuel M. Plata
- Succeeded by: Ángel García Peña

Personal details
- Born: March 19, 1862 Chihuahua City, Chihuahua, Mexico
- Died: March 25, 1912 (aged 50) Rellano, Chihuahua, Mexico
- Education: Heroic Military Academy

Military service
- Allegiance: Porfiriato
- Branch: Mexican Army
- Years of service: 1884 – 1912
- Rank: Brigadier General
- Commands: División del Norte
- Battles/wars: Caste War of Yucatán; Yaqui Wars; Mexican Revolution: First Battle of Rellano †

José González Salas (1862-1912) was a Mexican general who participated in the Mexican Revolution who was Secretary of War and Navy of Mexico twice throughout his career before committing suicide after the First Battle of Rellano.

== Early years ==
He was born in Chihuahua City on March 19, 1862, as the son of José González Parra and Luz Salas de González. He married Herminia Trillo and had five children: Luz, Herminia, Salvador, José and Amelia.

He studied at the Heroic Military Academy from January 9, 1881, to January 10, 1884, and graduated as a lieutenant of the staff of engineers. He immediately began to work in said school as a teacher; He reached the rank of lieutenant colonel of the facultative staff of engineers on July 15, 1898.

In February 1901 he was commissioned by President Porfirio Díaz to go to Yucatán under the orders of General José María de la Vega and participate in the Caste War of Yucatán. For his performance in the war, he was promoted to colonel of the infantry and received command of the 2nd Infantry Battalion. He later joined the 1st Military Zone where he was in charge of the second line of operations.

Between 1906 and 1908, González Salas participated in the Yaqui Wars as chief of expeditionary columns and fought in Sierra del Bacatete on July 25, 1906, Aguaje y la Burra on July 29, San Lorenzo y El Tunal on December 29, Los Arrayales in May 1907, and Algodones Canyon on April 26, 1908. On July 4, 1908, he marched to the Bacatete camp where, on behalf of the chief of the 1st Military Zone, he began talks with the ringleader Luis Buli to obtain the surrender of the Yaquis but was unsuccessful with this.

== Mexican Revolution ==
Being Commander of the 2nd Infantry Battalion, he was promoted to brigadier general and was discharged into the army staff on March 8. He was simultaneously acting in charge of the Department of Infantry from November 1, 1909, to July 18, 1911. During the interim government of Francisco León de la Barra, he accused Emiliano Zapata being a bandit and incorrigible. He served for a few months as chief of arms of the plaza of Morelia, Michoacán, and on July 19 he was appointed undersecretary of War and Navy with secretary functions, in the cabinet of Francisco I. Madero.

That same month he received the rank of brigadier general. On March 4, 1912, he resigned from the aforementioned secretariat and asked Madero to remain in charge of the troops that would fight the Orozquistas, unleashed at the beginning of the month.

The next day he was authorized to carry out this task and he was entrusted with the command of the forces that operated in Coahuila, Chihuahua, Durango and Zacatecas so that he would fight the insurgents.

He arranged for the troops under his command to be concentrated in Torreón, and on the 18th he left Mexico City. At Coahuila City, he organized what would later become the Northern Division, made up of approximately 2,150 men divided into one infantry and two cavalry bridges.

He was defeated by the Orozquistas at the First Battle of Rellano on March 24, 1912, and, feeling responsible for the failure, committed suicide in a railroad car in Corralitos the next day. His death shocked both President Madero and General Victoriano Huerta, who avenged his death by later defeating Orozco at the Second Battle of Rellano.
