= Rellano railway station =

Coordinates: 26.8219°N 104.005°W

Rellano is a railroad station in the south of the Mexican state of Chihuahua. It is located in the southern portion of the Bolsón de Mapimí river basin. During the Mexican Revolution it was the site of two major battles during Pascual Orozco's rebellion; the First Battle of Rellano and the Second Battle of Rellano.
