= Battle of Cuautla =

Battle of the Mexican Revolution

Coordinates: 18°49′N 98°57′W

- Part of Mexican Revolution
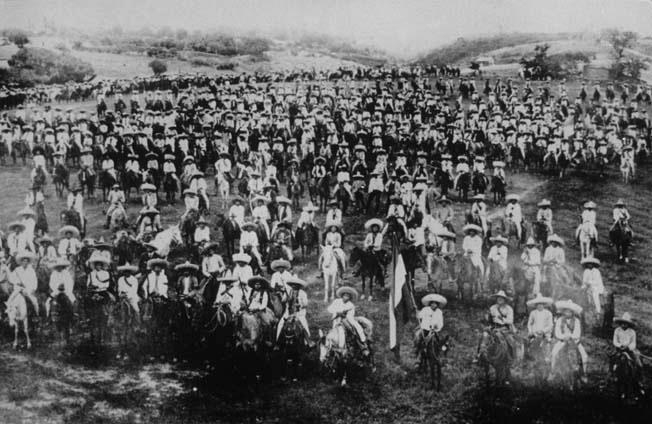
- Zapata's troops on the march in Morelos
Date	May 11–19, 1911
Location	Cuautla, Morelos
Result	Zapatista victory

Belligerents
Maderistas: Liberation Army of the South	Government: Fifth Cavalry Regiment of the Federal Army

Commanders and leaders
Emiliano Zapata	Col. Eutiquio Munguia

Strength
4,000	350–400

Casualties and losses
Between 1,000 and 1,500	Only a handful survived

The Battle of Cuautla was a battle between the forces of Emiliano Zapata and the federal army of the Mexican government that took place in the state of Morelos from May 11–19, 1911, during the Mexican Revolution. It has sometimes been described as "six of the most terrible days of battle in the whole Revolution". Eventually, the remains of the defending "Golden Fifth" regiment, the Fifth Cavalry Regiment of the Federal Army, withdrew and Zapata took control of the town. The Zapatista victory convinced Porfirio Díaz to come to terms with Francisco Madero, agree to the Treaty of Ciudad Juárez and resign as president.

While the Zapatistas enjoyed numerical supremacy, the federal troops held strong defensive positions, were better armed and trained, and unlike the rebels, had artillery with them.

== Political background ==
In late 1910 and early 1911 armed insurrections against the regime of Porfirio Díaz broke out throughout Mexico. The two main centers of opposition were located in the northern state of Chihuahua, where Francisco Madero, Pancho Villa and Pascual Orozco besieged the city of Ciudad Juárez, and the state of Morelos, where Emiliano Zapata led an armed agrarian uprising.

By early March Zapata became concerned that if he did not control the main urban centers in Morelos before Madero began negotiations with Díaz, the demands of his movement would be sidelined. He also wanted to ensure the autonomy of Morelos from the national government. Finally, Zapata's rise in Morelos created the potential for conflict with the powerful Figueroa family who controlled the neighboring state of Guerrero.

On April 22, 1911, Zapata met with Ambrosio Figueroa and the two agreed that they would operate independently anywhere in Mexico, with Zapata in supreme command if joint operations were carried out in Morelos. Figueroa promised military support to Zapata in Morelos but Zapata did not trust him. Zapata was afraid that if he attacked the easiest target, the city of Jojutla, which traditionally paid protection money to the Figueroas, they and their troops would abandon him and leave him faced against a numerically superior force of federal troops. Consequently, he decided to attack the better garrisoned and fortified city of Cuautla.

Because he wanted to disguise his intentions, Zapata first conducted raids in the state of Puebla, took the towns of Chietla, Izúcar, Metepec and Atlixco in order to obtain supplies and levy more soldiers and then captured Yautepec, and Jonacatepec in Morelos. He arrived at Cuautla on May 11, 1911.

== Battle ==
Zapata had 4,000 troops who were inexperienced in laying sieges. In turn, the city was defended by an elite force of around 350 to 400 veteran federal soldiers of the undefeated "Golden Fifth" regiment. By May 12, the Zapatistas had fully surrounded the town and cut off communications with rest of Mexico. The commander of Cuautla refused to surrender, vowing to fight "as long as (he had) a soldier and a cartridge".

The battle that Zapata faced was different from what he was used to. In open engagements, Zapata, like Villa, relied mostly on swift cavalry charges, which would allow him to close fast with the enemy before the machine guns of the federal troops could mow down his horsemen. At Cuautla however, the soldiers were well fortified beyond barricades and possessed heavy artillery which would make standard cavalry charges ineffective. Additionally, the federales held high positions on top of the town's aqueducts from which they had control of the Western side of town.

On the first day, around 300 of Zapata's soldiers were killed in an attack on the town. On May 14, his troops managed to cut the federal troops off from water supplies. The next day, Zapata launched a general assault and had his troops pour gasoline into the empty aqueducts and set them alight. The fire dislodged the soldiers of the Fifth from their excellent positions, burning many of them alive. An empty railroad car which was turned into a bunker, complete with a machine gun nest was also doused with gasoline and set alight burning to death all the federal soldiers inside. Most of the fighting was hand to hand, with machetes and bayonets, and soldiers and rebels often fired at each other at point blank range. No prisoners were taken by either side. In the end, that day's assault was repulsed.

As the battle dragged on, General Victoriano Huerta arrived in nearby Cuernavaca, capital of Morelos, with 600 soldiers with the hope of coming in aid of the besieged federal garrison. However, Huerta realized that if he left the capital unattended, a rebellion could potentially break out in his rear and he decided to leave the Golden Fifth to their fate.

The federal troops began running out of ammunition and the exhausted remains of the Golden Fifth regiment decided to pull out of town on May 19, and Zapata's troops occupied the town.

== Aftermath ==
Porfirio Díaz himself later stated that it was the fall of Cuautla to Zapata which convinced him to come to peace with Madero. On May 21, 1911, he signed the Treaty of Ciudad Juárez, two days after the capture of the town.

After the resignation of Díaz, the Zapatista rebellion in Morelos continued. Zapata refused to recognize the interim president Francisco León de la Barra and over the rest of 1911 came to trust Madero less and less. In November 1911 he issued his famous Plan of Ayala in which he denounced Madero.
