= Francisco León de la Barra =

President of Mexico in 1911

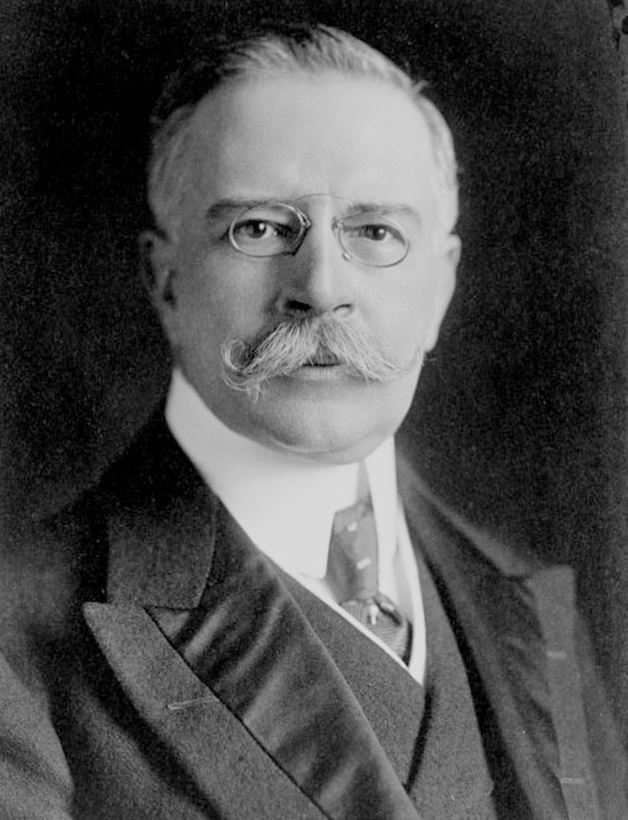
- León de la Barra, c. 1910

36th President of Mexico
- In office 25 May – 6 November 1911
- Vice President: Vacant (Note: President Porfirio Díaz reestablished the office of Vice President in 1904, with Ramón Corral in the position. Both Díaz and Corral resigned in May 1911. As León de la Barra, Díaz's replacement, was merely interim president, no Vice President was chosen, and the office remained vacant until the inauguration of President Francisco I. Madero and Vice President José María Pino Suárez in November of 1911.)
- Preceded by: Porfirio Díaz
- Succeeded by: Francisco I. Madero

Secretary of Foreign Affairs
- In office 21 February – 6 July 1913
- President: Victoriano Huerta
- Preceded by: Pedro Lascuráin
- Succeeded by: Carlos Pereyra
- In office 1 April – 25 May 1911
- President: Porfirio Díaz
- Preceded by: Victoriano Salado Álvarez
- Succeeded by: Victoriano Salado Álvarez

Mexican ambassador to the United States
- In office 13 November 1908 – 25 March 1911
- President: Porfirio Díaz
- Preceded by: Enrique Creel
- Succeeded by: Manuel María de Zacamona e Inclán

Personal details
- Born: Francisco León de la Barra y Quijano; 16 June 1863 Santiago de Querétaro, Querétaro, Mexican Empire
- Died: 23 September 1939 (aged 76) (Note: Many sources list his date of death as September 23, 1939, but his tombstone at the Sabou Cemetery lists September 22, 1939 as his death date.) Biarritz, Pyrénées-Atlantiques, France
- Resting place: Père Lachaise Cemetery, Paris
- Party: Independent
- Spouse(s): María Elena Borneque (died 1909); María del Refugio Borneque (m. 1909)

Francisco León de la Barra y Quijano (16 June 1863 – 23 September 1939) was a Mexican political figure, diplomat, lawyer, and politician who served as the 36th President of Mexico from May 25 to November 6, 1911 during the Mexican Revolution, following the resignations of President Porfirio Díaz and Vice President Ramón Corral. He previously served as Secretary of Foreign Affairs for one month during the Díaz administration and again from 1913 to 1914 under President Victoriano Huerta. He was known to conservatives as "The White President" or the "Pure President".

== Early career ==
Francisco León de la Barra y Quijano was born on 16 June 1863 in Querétaro, Querétaro to Bernabé León de la Barra y Demaría and Luisa Quijano y Pérez Palacios. His father, who was born in Buenos Aires, Argentina, was a general, consul, and businessman who supported President Benito Juárez and the Liberals during the second French intervention in Mexico. His mother, originally from Yucatán, was the daughter of General Alejandro Quijano, under whom Bernabé served. León de la Barra's paternal grandfather, Juan Francisco León de la Barra, was an Argentine veteran of the Chilean War of Independence under Bernardo O'Higgins.

León de la Barra's primary studies were in Querétaro. He then studied law at the Scientific and Literary Institute of Querétaro. He received his law degree from the Escuela Nacional de Jurisprudencia in 1887, specializing in international law. He also served as a professor of mathematics at the Escuela Nacional Preparatoria at the age of 21.

He entered politics as a federal deputy in 1891. In 1892, he attended the Ibero-American Judicial Conference held in Madrid on the occasion of the four hundredth anniversary of Columbus' discovery of America.

In 1896, León de la Barra entered the Mexican diplomatic corps, serving as envoy to Brazil, Argentina, Uruguay, Paraguay, Belgium, the Netherlands, and the United States (1909–11).

He was a delegate at the Pan-American Conference from 1901 to 1902. He was Mexico's representative at The Hague peace conference in 1907. He was named Mexico's ambassador to the United States on 13 November 1908 to succeed Enrique Creel, presented his credentials on 27 February 1909, and served until 25 March 1911, later being succeeded by Manuel María de Zacamona e Inclán. He was made secretary of foreign affairs in President Porfirio Díaz's cabinet on 1 April 1911, succeeding Victoriano Salado Álvarez. He served until 25 May.

When the Mexican Revolution broke out in 1910, he was Ambassador to the U.S. Following the fraudulent elections of 1910, revolutionary forces rose up against Porfirio Díaz (r. 1876–80; 1884–1911), defeating the Federal Army and forcing his resignation as President. In the 21 May 1911 Treaty of Ciudad Juárez, León de la Barra was selected to be interim president, until elections could be held in the autumn of 1911. He was not a politician or a member of Díaz's Científicos, but rather a diplomat and lawyer.

== President of Mexico ==
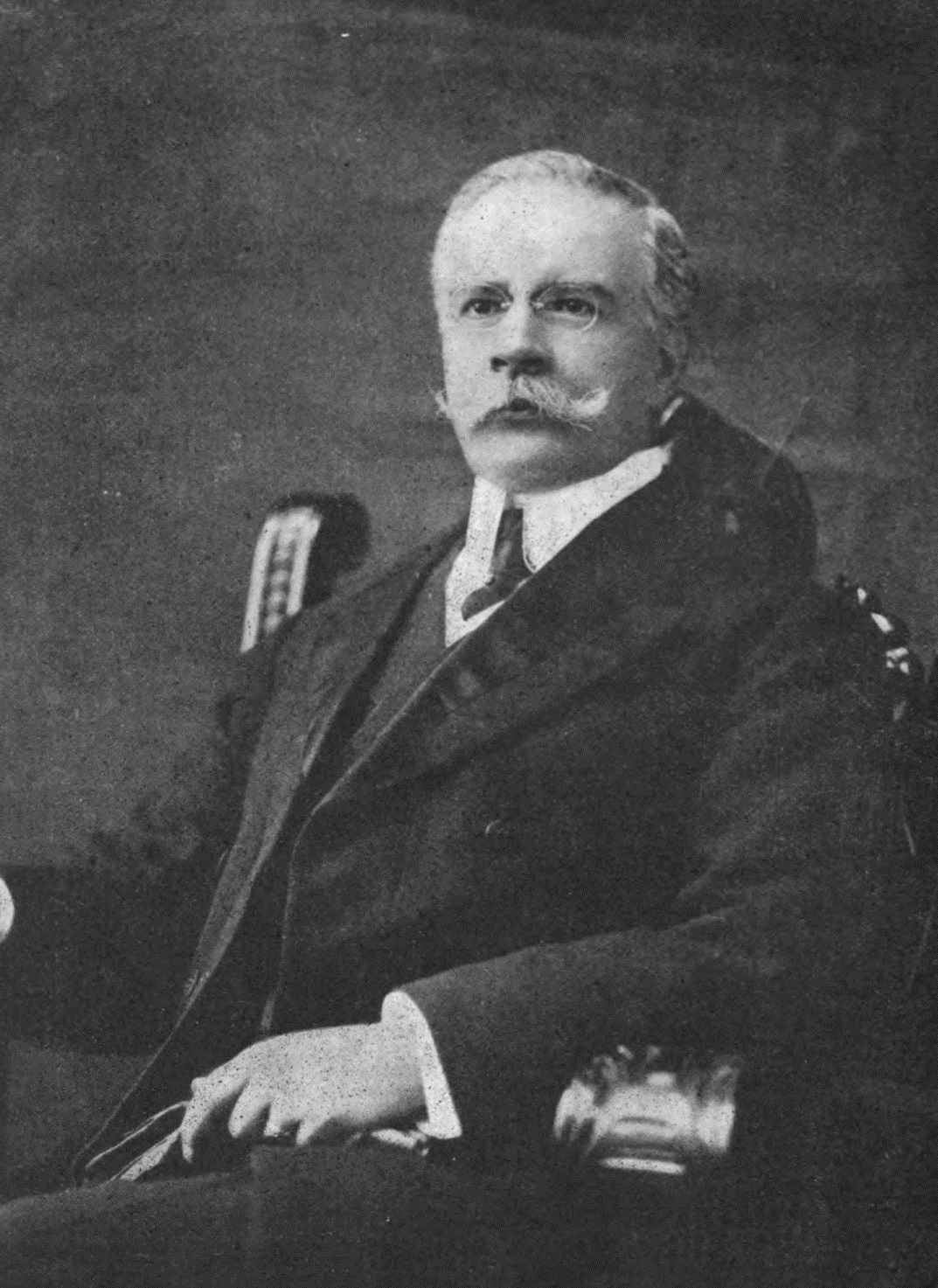
León de la Barra in 1911.

He served as president until November 6, 1911, when Madero took office 6 November 1911 as the duly-elected president. Although considered by conservatives the benign "White President," the German ambassador to Mexico, Paul von Hintze, who associated with the interim president, said of him that "De la Barra wants to accommodate himself with dignity to the inevitable advance of the ex-revolutionary influence, while accelerating the widespread collapse of the Madero party...."

León de la Barra appointed a cabinet consisting of Emilio Vázquez Gómez as secretary of the interior; Salado Álvarez as secretary of foreign affairs; Ernesto Madero as secretary of finance, public credit and commerce; Eugenio Rascón as secretary of war and navy; Manuel Bonilla as secretary of communications and public works; Manuel Calero y Sierra as secretary of development; Francisco Vázquez Gómez as secretary of public instruction and fine arts; and Rafael L. Hernández as secretary of justice. Alberto García Granados later replaced Emilio Vázquez Gómez, Bartolomé Carvajal y Rosas replaced Salado Álvarez, José González Salas replaced Rascón who was also later replaced by Manuel M. Plata, and Hernández and Calero y Sierra swapped positions.

There were pressures for León de la Barra to run for the presidency himself, but he resisted. He did promote democracy and the elections that brought Madero to the presidency were considered free and fair. There was a controversy during the summer of 1911 when fighting broke out in the streets of Puebla between federal soldiers and irregulars who supported Madero. President León de la Barra blamed his minister of the interior, Emilio Vázquez Gómez, the brother of Madero's vice presidential running mate, Francisco Vázquez Gómez for the violence and its mishandling. Madero replaced his running mate with José María Pino Suárez.

In the 1911 election, León de la Barra was a candidate for the presidency and vice presidency. He came in second for both positions, losing the presidency to Madero and the vice presidency to Pino Suárez. He received 87 votes (0.4%) for president and 5,564 votes for vice president. (Note: Sources disagree on the percentage of the vice-presidential vote that he received. One source says 34.7%, while another says 28.67%.) His presidential candidacy was supported by the Radical Liberal Party, and his vice presidential candidacy was supported by National Catholic Party. The election is considered Mexico's first free election of the 20th century.

In his inauguration address to the nation, León de la Barra had three stated goals: the restoration of order, bringing about free and fair elections, and the continuation of reforms promised at the end of the Díaz presidency. Since Madero had called on his revolutionary followers to lay down their arms, despite their having brought about conditions forcing Díaz's resignation, there was continuing turmoil in areas where they had mobilized. He sought to disarm the irregular forces, remove them from the army payroll, and send them home. In Morelos, Emiliano Zapata and his followers resisted demobilization, and León de la Barra sent troops under General Victoriano Huerta to put down the rebellion. Huerta failed to do that, but did wreak havoc in Morelos, burning villages and attacking the local population. Rebellions in other parts of the country, in Baja California, Oaxaca, and Chiapas were successfully repressed.

During his presidency, he did implement some reforms, including improved funding for rural schools; promoting some aspects of agrarian reform to increase the amount of productive land; labor reforms including workman's compensation and the eight-hour day; but also the right of the government to intervene in strikes. According to historian Peter V.N. Henderson, León de la Barra's and congress's actions "suggests that few Porfirians wished to return to the status quo of the dictatorship. Rather, the thoughtful, progressive members of the Porfirian meritocracy recognized the need for change."

== Subsequent career ==
León de la Barra ran for the Mexican Congress in 1912 and was elected a senator, aligned with the Científicos and the National Catholic Party. León de la Barra colluded with U.S. Ambassador to Mexico Henry Lane Wilson to oust Madero from the presidency. During the Ten Tragic Days of February 1913, Madero resigned and was then assassinated.

In January 1912, León de la Barra visited Italy as an envoy of gratitude for the centennial celebration of Mexican independence and by the end of 1913, he also traveled Japan.

Succeeding Madero's secretary of foreign affairs and fellow interim president Pedro Lascuráin, León de la Barra was again made secretary of foreign affairs by President Victoriano Huerta on 21 February 1913. He served until 6 July, when he was succeeded by Carlos Pereyra. He was then was appointed ambassador to France (1913–14). He retired to Europe and became president of the Permanent Court of Arbitration, located in The Hague. He participated in various international commissions after World War I and wrote many works on judicial and administrative affairs.

In early 1939, León de la Barra was used by the French foreign minister Georges Bonnet as an unofficial diplomat to begin talks with General Francisco Franco for French recognition of the Spanish Nationalists as the legitimate government of Spain. The Spanish Nationalists overthrew the Second Spanish Republic in the Spanish Civil War, allying with Nazi Germany and Fascist Italy. As a result of the talks León de la Barra began, France recognized the Spanish Nationalists in February 1939.

Anyone associated with the Huerta regime has been tainted in modern Mexican history by the association, including Francisco León de la Barra.

== Personal life and death ==
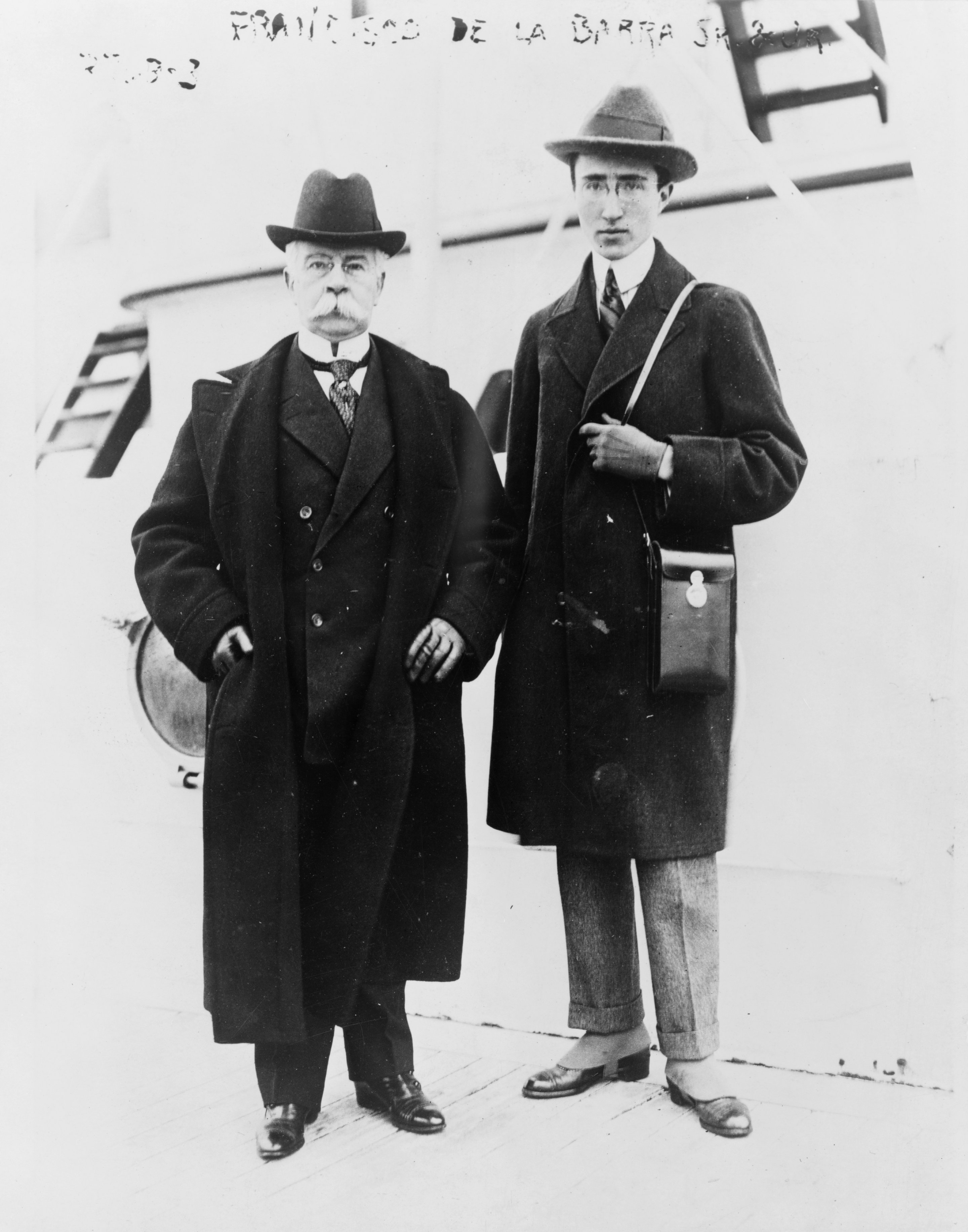
León de la Barra (left) in 1916 with son Francisco León de la Barra Borneque (right).

León de la Barra married María Elena Borneque, a French Mexican woman. They had two sons, Francisco and Julio, neither of whom survived to adulthood. Borneque died in 1909, and after a mourning period, León de la Barra married her sister, María del Refugio Borneque.

León de la Barra's brother Ignacio was once the director of public works of Mexico City. León de la Barra was also the brother-in-law of Manuela Santacilia y Juárez, the granddaughter of President Benito Juárez. His son-in-law, Alfonso Alemán, joined Francisco Franco's nationalist FET y de las JONS faction against the republican Spanish Armed Forces in the Spanish Civil War.

He died in Biarritz in September 1939, without ever returning to Mexico.

== See also ==
- List of heads of state of Mexico

== Notes ==
Political offices
Preceded by Porfirio Díaz	President of Mexico; 25 May – 5 November 1911	Succeeded by Francisco I. Madero
