= Victoriano Salado Álvarez =

Mexican politician

Victoriano Salado
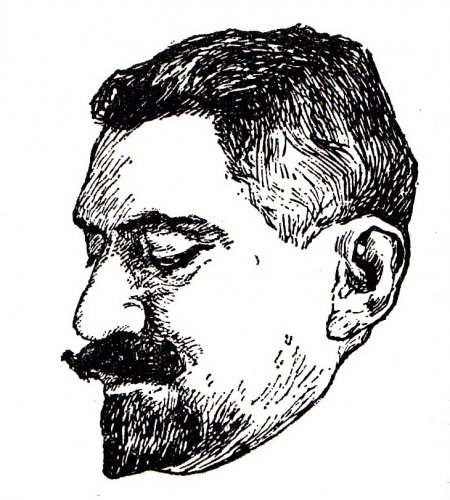

Secretary of Foreign Affairs
- President: Porfirio Díaz

Ambassador of Mexico to Guatemala
- In office 24 July 1911 – 13 May 1912
- Preceded by: José Mariano Crespo y Beltranera (interim)
- Succeeded by: Reynaldo Gordillo y León

Ambassador of Mexico to El Salvador
- In office 16 June 1911 – 11 March 1912
- Preceded by: Luis G. Pardo
- Succeeded by: Reynaldo Gordillo y León

Personal details
- Born: Victoriano Salado Álvarez; 30 September 1867 Teocaltiche, Jalisco
- Died: 13 October 1931 (aged 64) Mexico City

Victoriano Salado Álvarez (30 September 1867 – 13 October 1931) was a Mexican writer, a prominent figure on the debate about Modernism in Mexican literature. He also served as secretary of Foreign Affairs in the cabinet of President Porfirio Díaz (1911) and as envoy extraordinary and minister plenipotentiary of Mexico to Guatemala and El Salvador (1911–1912).

He was born in Teocaltiche, Jalisco, on 30 September 1867 and died in Mexico City, on 13 October 1931.

== Works ==
- Episodios nacionales mexicanos (seven volumes, 1902-1906).
- De mi cosecha (1899).
- De autos (1901).
- México peregrino (1924).
- Memorias de Victoriano Salado Álvarez
- La vida azarosa y romántica de don Carlos María de Bustamante (1933).
- La novela vivida del primer ministro de México en los Estados Unidos (1937).
