= Second Battle of Rellano =

1912 battle of the Mexican Revolution

- Part of the Mexican Revolution
Date	22 May 1912
Location	Rellano, Chihuahua
Result	Government victory

Belligerents
Orozquistas	Government: División del Norte

Commanders and leaders
Pascual Orozco	Victoriano Huerta; Pancho Villa

Strength
7,000–8,000	Unknown

Casualties and losses
At least 600 dead	140 (both dead and wounded)

The Second Battle of Rellano of 22 May 1912 was an engagement of the Mexican Revolution between rebel forces under Pascual Orozco and government troops under General Victoriano Huerta, at the railroad station of Rellano, Chihuahua. The battle was a setback for Orozco, who had defeated another government army at the First Battle of Rellano in March of the same year.

== Background ==
After the overthrow of Porfirio Díaz's regime, which he took part in, Pascual Orozco became dissatisfied with the way that Francisco Madero was running Mexico. He was also thwarted in his personal ambitions when Madero appointed Venustiano Carranza as minister of defense, and Abraham González as governor of Chihuahua. As a result, in March 1912, Orozco formally declared himself to be in rebellion against Madero.

On 24 March 1912, Orozco defeated a federal army under General José González Salas which had been sent to capture him, near the railroad station of Rellano. This marked the high point of his rebellion, as he controlled all of Chihuahua except the town of Parral which was defended by Pancho Villa who had remained loyal to Madero. Orozco proceeded to attack the town. While Villa eventually had to retreat from Parral, his stubborn resistance gave crucial town for another federal army, under Victoriano Huerta, to make its way north to Chihuahua and confront Orozco again. Villa joined Huerta, who was the commander of the División del Norte, and was placed under his command.

== The battle ==
The initial clash between Huerta's and Villa's force and Orozco's rebels took place at a railroad station of Conejos, just north of Torreón, Coahuila. There, the federal forces successfully repulsed several attacks by the colorados (as Orozco's followers were known due to their red flags) and drove them back. In the retreat, Orozco's men abandoned three of their cannons which was to prove crucial in the engagement that followed.

After securing his rear and receiving additional reinforcements from Madero (whose redeployment eased the pressure on Emiliano Zapata, who was also in rebellion in Morelos) Huerta began moving north in pursuit of Orozco, along the railroad. As at the first battle of Rellano, Orozco's troops ripped apart rail tracks as they retreated in order to slow down the federal forces, and then entrenched themselves at the canyon around the railroad station of Rellano. Orozco manned both sides of the canyon, but having lost several cannon at Conejos only had enough artillery to equip the western hill.

Upon arriving at the Rellano station, Huerta had Villa make several probing attacks to test the enemies. Although these were easily repulsed by Orozco's men, they revealed their positions and the fact that the eastern hill lacked artillery support. As a result, on the night of the 22nd, Huerta ordered Villa to take the hill, while the federal artillery shelled both rebel positions to hide the troops' movements. As soon as Villa succeeded Huerta moved his artillery to this newly captured position. Since the eastern hill of the canyon was higher than the western, from this spot the federals were able to rain down artillery fire on the Orozcistas. The rebels attempted to retake the hill, but faced with artillery fire were beaten back. Huerta continued to shell the rebels, and at 9:45 the following morning, he ordered a cavalry charge which after a few hours' fighting, dislodged the rebels from their positions.

The retreating colorados boarded trains that were waiting for them at the station and left the area. Huerta's troops, which were running low on supplies were unable to engage in immediate pursuit. At this point, Orozco attempted a variation on a tactic that he had successfully employed at the first battle of Rellano. There, Orozco had a locomotive filled with dynamite (the loco loco or the máquina loca), which he then sent against incoming federal troops. This time, he ordered his men to mine the rail tracks behind them, in the hope that Huerta would be too eager to pursue him to take proper precautions. Unfortunately for Orozco, one of the mines detonated prematurely, damaging only a railcar with coal and also alerting Huerta to the possible danger. As a result, Huerta proceeded more carefully, and his engineers managed to find all the remaining mines placed by Orozco's men.

Huerta finally caught up with the rebels at the Bachimba rail station. After fierce fighting, Orozco's troops, demoralized and unwilling to face Huerta's artillery, fled to Chihuahua, and then scattered into small guerilla bands.

== Aftermath ==
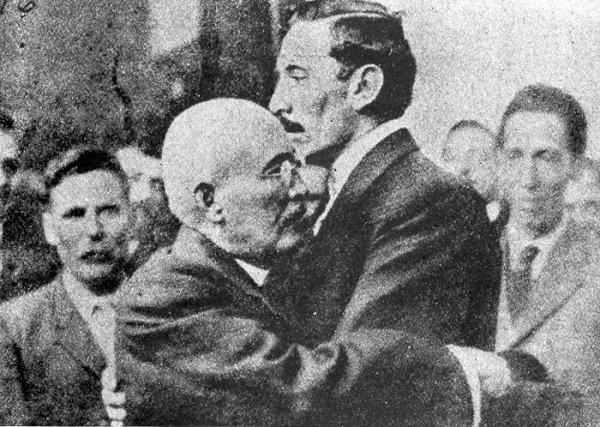
Former enemies reconciled. Orozco (right) gives Huerta (left) his support after the general's coup against Madero.

Orozco's defeat at the Second Battle of Rellano effectively ended his rebellion. Victorious Huerta retook Chihuahua City on July 8, recaptured Ciudad Juárez in July and reinstated Abraham González as governor. Orozco himself fled into exile to the United States. A young general, Álvaro Obregón mopped up the remains of the colorados in Chihuahua and Sonora.

A longer term effect was that it made Huerta a hero to the federal army staff and forced Madero to double expenditure on the armed forces. This marked the beginning of Madero becoming beholden to the army, which in turn plotted against him. Huerta was further angered because had expected to be promoted by Madero as a reward for his rebellion, but instead was asked to retire (Madero belatedly became aware of the threat that the general posed). This culminated in Huerta's coup d'état against Madero in February, the assassination of Madero, and the next stage of the revolution. Ironically, after Madero's fall, Orozco supported his former adversary, Huerta. After Huerta was defeated both men fled to the United States. Orozco was killed while trying to sneak back into Mexico in August 1915.

== Works cited ==
- Frank McLynn, "Villa and Zapata. A History of the Mexican Revolution", Basic Books, 2000, .
- Friedrich Katz, "The Life and Times of Pancho Villa", Stanford University Press, 1998, .
- René De La Pedraja Tomán, "Wars of Latin America, 1899-1941", McFarland, 2006, .
- Robert L. Scheina, "Latin America's Wars: The age of the professional soldier, 1900-2001, V.2", Brasey Inc., 2003, .
