= Francisco Vázquez Gómez =

Mexican politician

Francisco Vásquez Gómez
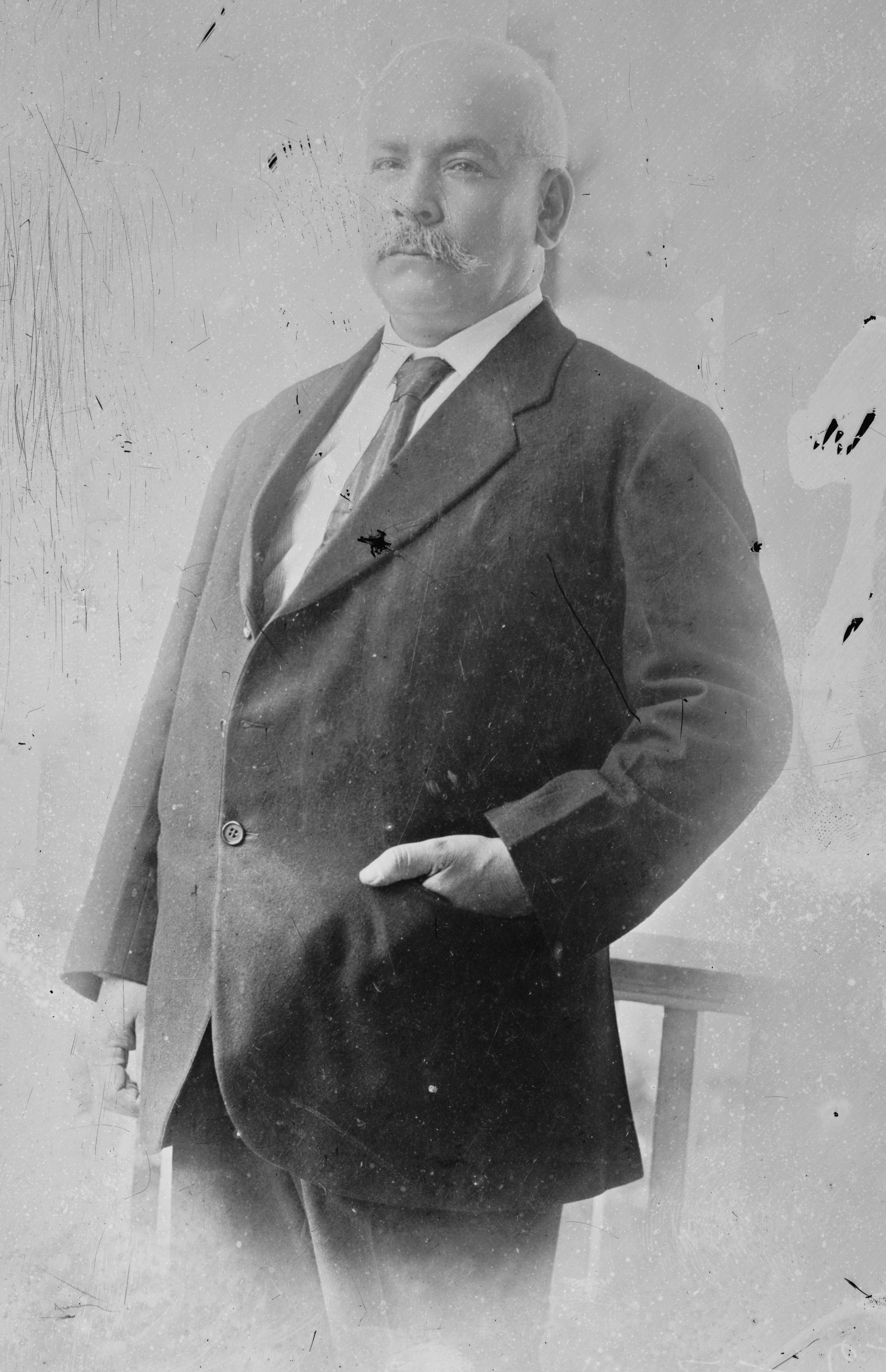

Minister of Public Instruction
- In office 26 May 1911 – 5 November 1911
- President: Francisco León de la Barra

Personal details
- Born: 23 September 1860 Tula, Tamaulipas, Mexico
- Died: 16 August 1933 (aged 72) Mexico City, Mexico
- Education: National School of Medicine (1889)
- Profession: Physician and politician

Francisco Vázquez Gómez (23 September 1860 – 16 August 1933) served as personal physician to Mexican president Porfirio Díaz, as Minister of Public Instruction to President Francisco León de la Barra and as a running mate to Francisco I. Madero during the 1910 presidential elections. Prior to this Vázquez Gómez had been a supporter of Bernardo Reyes, another presidential hopeful with strong ties to Díaz' regime.

== Biography ==
Vázquez Gómez was born in Tula, Tamaulipas, into a rich Amerindian family. He studied medicine in Mexico City and worked as a physician in Xalapa before returning to serve as the personal physician to long-time serving president Díaz. In 1909, he joined his brother Emilio in the anti-reelectionist movement but refused to join a national call to arms after the government illegally imprisoned former presidential candidate Francisco I. Madero, with whom he campaigned on a narrow, pro free-market and democratic government.

After a short voluntary exile in El Paso, Texas, he returned to Mexico to assume the Ministry of Public Instruction in the presidential cabinet of Francisco León de la Barra (26 May - 5 November 1911).
