= Pancho Villa in popular culture =

Pancho Villa was famous during the Mexican Revolution and has remained so, holding a fairly mythical reputation in Mexican consciousness, but not officially recognized in Mexico until long after his death. As the "Centaur from the North" he was considered a threat to property and order on both sides of the border, feared, and revered, as a modern Robin Hood.

Pancho Villa remains a controversial figure in the United States. USA Today reported, "A terrorist in 1916, a tourist attraction in 2011. ... On Jan. 8, 1916, 18 U.S. businessmen were massacred by Villa's men in a train robbery in northern Mexico. It was not the first or last of Villa's atrocities; he personally shot a priest who begged for clemency for his villagers, as well as a woman who blamed him for her husband's death."

== In films, video, and television ==
Villa appeared as himself in the films Life of Villa (1912), Barbarous Mexico (1913), With General Pancho Villa in Mexico (1913), The Life of General Villa (1914) and Following the Flag in Mexico (1916).

Films based on Pancho Villa have appeared since the early years of the Revolution and have continued to be made into the twenty-first century. Hollywood's role in the shaping of the image of Villa, the Mexican Revolution, and U.S. public opinion has been the subject of a scholarly study. The 1934 biopic Viva Villa! was nominated for an Academy Award for Best Picture. In 2003, HBO broadcast And Starring Pancho Villa as Himself, with Antonio Banderas as Villa that focuses on the making of the film The Life of General Villa.

Actors who have portrayed Villa include:

- Raoul Walsh (1912, 1914) The Life of General Villa
- Wallace Beery (1917) Patria
- George Humbert (1918) Why America Will Win
- Wallace Beery (1934) Viva Villa!, with Phillip Cooper (Pancho Villa as a boy)
- Juan F. Triana (1935) El Tesoro de Pancho Villa
- Domingo Soler (1936) Vámonos con Pancho Villa
- Maurice Black (1937) Under Strange Flags
- Leo Carrillo (1949) Pancho Villa Returns
- Pedro Armendáriz (1950, 1957, 1960 twice)
- Alan Reed (1952) Viva Zapata!
- Victor Alcocer (1955) El siete leguas
- Rodolfo Hoyos Jr. (1958) Villa!!
- Rafael Campos (1959) Have Gun - Will Travel; Season 3, Episode 6 (Pancho)
- José Elías Moreno (1967) El Centauro Pancho Villa
- Ricardo Palacios (1967) Los siete de Pancho Villa
- Yul Brynner (1968) Villa Rides
- Telly Savalas (1972) Pancho Villa
- Heraclio Zepeda (1973) Reed, México insurgente
- Antonio Aguilar (1974) La Muerte de Pancho Villa
- Héctor Elizondo (1976) Wanted: The Sundance Woman (TV)
- Freddy Fender (1977) She Came to the Valley
- José Villamor (1980) Viva México (TV)
- Jorge Reynoso (1982) Red Bells: Mexico in Flames
- Gaithor Brownne (1985) Blood Church
- Guillermo Gil (1987) Senda de Gloria (TV series)
- Pedro Armendáriz Jr. (1989) Old Gringo
- Mike Moroff (1992) The Young Indiana Jones Chronicles, Young Indiana Jones and the Curse of the Jackal, "Mexico, March 1916", The Adventures of Young Indiana Jones: Spring Break Adventure
- Antonio Aguilar (1993) La sangre de un valiente
- Alonso Echánove (1993) By Our Own Correspondent
- Jesús Ochoa (1995) Entre Pancho Villa y una mujer desnuda
- Carlos Roberto Majul (1999) Ah! Silenciosa
- Peter Butler (2000) From Dusk Till Dawn 3: The Hangman's Daughter
- Antonio Banderas (2003) And Starring Pancho Villa as Himself (HBO)
- Alejandro Calva (2009) Chico Grande

More films about Villa:

- Pancho Villa's Shadow (1933) by Miguel Contreras Torres
- Deadliest Warrior, Spike TV's hit show, featured Pancho Villa in a match-up against Chief Crazy Horse (2011)
- Wild Roses, Tender Roses (2012), based on the novel The Friends of Pancho Villa, by James Carlos Blake
- Young Guns 3: Dead or Alive (2025 or 2026) This Emilio Estevez picture features Billy the Kid a.k.a William Roberts and he will fight alongside Pancho Villa in the Mexican revolution.

== In literature ==
- In Mariano Azuela's novel The Underdogs, anti-federal soldiers talk about him as an archetype of an anti-authoritarian bandit: "Villa, indomitable lord of the sierra, the eternal victim of all governments... Villa tracked, hunted down like a wild beast... Villa the reincarnation of the old legend; Villa as Providence, the bandit, that passes through the world armed with the blazing torch of an ideal: to rob the rich and give to the poor. It was the poor who built up and imposed a legend about him which Time itself was to increase and embellish as a shining example from generation to generation." However, a little later, one character distrusts the rumors: "Anastasio Montañéz questioned the speaker more particularly. It was not long before he realized that all this high praise was hearsay and that not a single man in Natera's army had ever laid eyes on Villa."
- Whatever the reality behind the legends, even after his defeat Villa remained a powerful character still lurking in the Mexican mind. In 1950 Octavio Paz wrote, in his morose but thoughtful book on the Mexican soul The Labyrinth of Solitude, "The brutality and uncouthness of many of the revolutionary leaders has not prevented them from becoming popular myths. Villa still gallops through the north, in songs and ballads; Zapata dies at every popular fair... It is the Revolution, the magical word, the word that is going to change everything, that is going to bring us immense delight and a quick death."
- El águila y la serpiente by Martín Luis Guzmán (1930); it "can be considered as [Guzmán's] reminiscences of Villa and his movement.
- The Gringo Bandit (1947), by William Hopson.
- The Friends of Pancho Villa (1996), by James Carlos Blake.
- In the Southern Victory Series novels The Great War: American Front and The Great War: Walk in Hell by Harry Turtledove, Doroteo Arango is a candidate for the Radical Liberal Party in the 1915 Confederate States Presidential Election, representing Chihuahua, which the CSA purchased in 1881 and retained following the Second Mexican War fought between the CSA and the United States. He went on to be soundly defeated in the election to the Whig candidate and incumbent Vice President, Gabriel Semmes.
- In the alternate history short story "Compadres" by S.M. Stirling collected in the anthology Alternate Generals II (2002) edited by Harry Turtledove, The American territory of annexation following the end of the Mexican-American War in 1848 included Chihuahua. Decades later, Pancho Villa would become a Senator of the State of Chihuahua and is later the running mate of Theodore Roosevelt in the 1904 presidential election.
- He is featured in several magazines such as Lost Treasure (magazine) in which it is rumored that during his military campaigns, he has buried several items of gold, silver and cash worth several billions of US dollars all over the place.

== In music ==
- "Como Pancho Villa," a corrido by Chino Pacas
- "Pancho Villa," a song by Billy Walker
- "Pancho Villa From a Safe Distance," an opera by Graham Reynolds
- "Pancho and Lefty," a song by Townes Van Zandt about a fictional bandit named Pancho, loosely based on Pancho Villa. The song was famously covered by Willie Nelson and Merle Haggard.
- "Ride With Me Gringo," a song by Riders In The Sky
- "Viva Pancho Villa," a song by Hoyt Axton
- "Pancho Villa," a song by Sun Kil Moon
