= Second Battle of Agua Prieta =

Battle of the Mexican Revolution

- Part of the Mexican Revolution
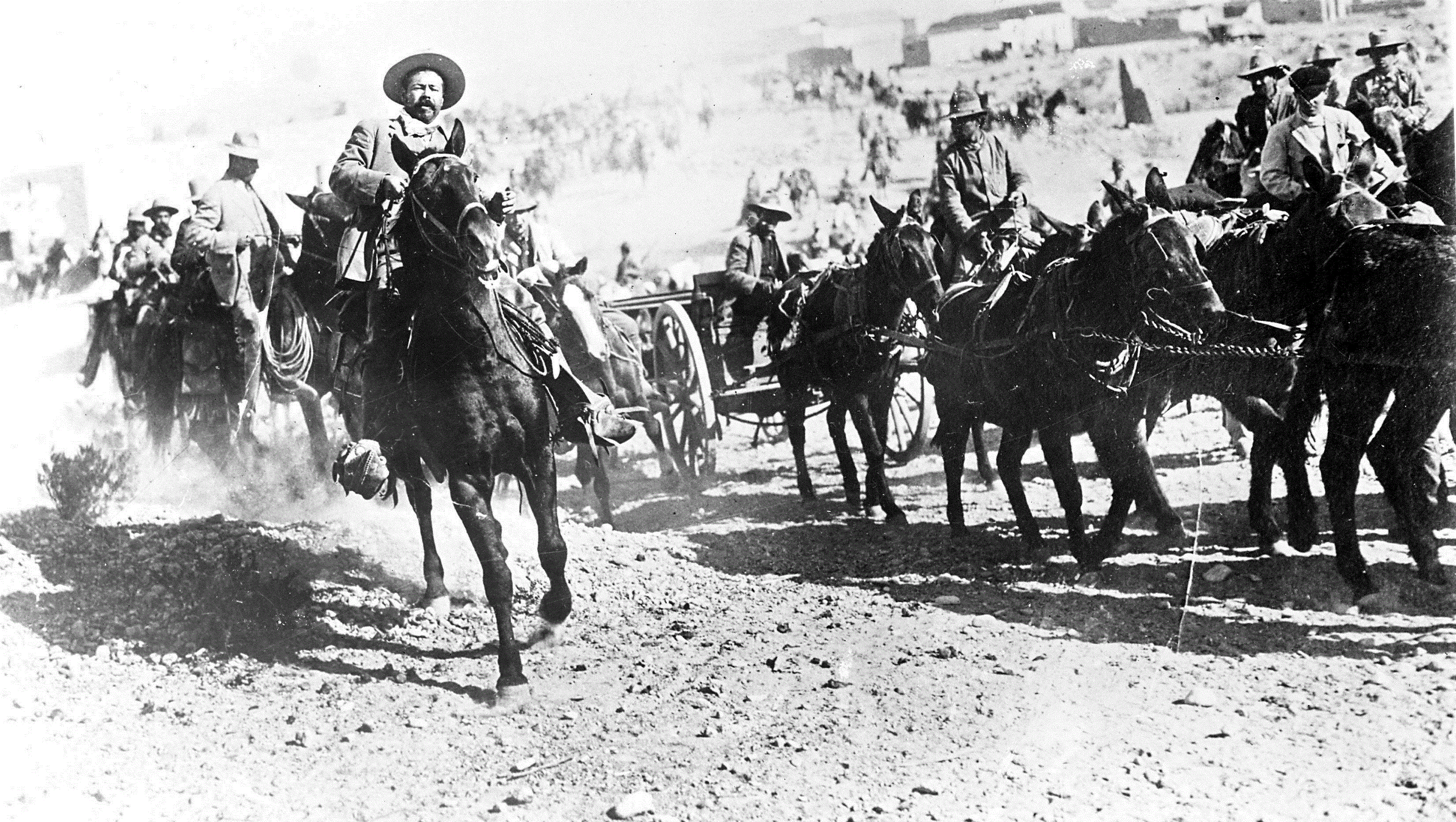
- Pancho Villa and his army in northern Mexico.
Date	November 1, 1915
Location	Agua Prieta, Sonora
Result	Constitutionalist victory

Belligerents
Conventionists: División del Norte	Constitutionalists: Constitutional Army

Commanders and leaders
Pancho Villa	Plutarco Elías Calles

Strength
15,000	6,500

Casualties and losses
Unknown	45 dead 90 wounded

The Second Battle of Agua Prieta, 1 November 1915, was fought between the forces of Pancho Villa and those of the future President of Mexico, Plutarco Elías Calles, a supporter of Venustiano Carranza, at Agua Prieta, Sonora, as part of the Mexican Revolution. Villa's attack on the town was repulsed by Calles. The battle helped to establish Carranza's control over Mexico and directly led to his becoming, with United States recognition, president. Villa believed that Calles had received tactical and strategic support from the United States since the town is located across the border from Douglas, Arizona and launched his raid on Columbus, New Mexico partly as a reprisal.

== Background ==
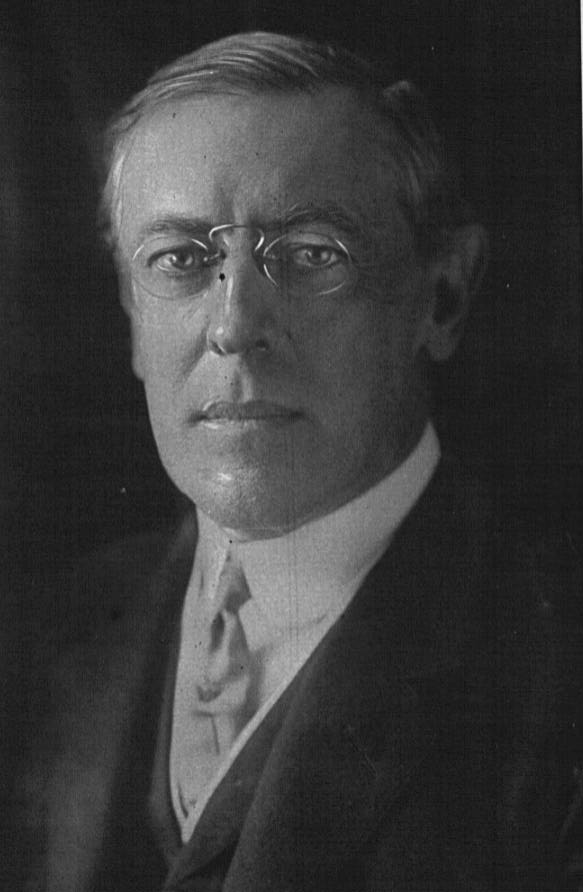
In mid 1915, the administration of Woodrow Wilson switched from backing Pancho Villa to supporting his opponent, Venustiano Carranza. Villa believed that help rendered by the United States to Carranza at Agua Prieta was the major factor in his defeat.

After the defeat of Gen. Victoriano Huerta the revolutionary forces split among themselves. Emiliano Zapata and Pancho Villa reconciled their differences during the Convention of Aguascalientes, and as a result were often referred to as the "Conventionalistas", but they came into conflict with the so-called "Constitutionalistas", or "Carrancistas", of Venustiano Carranza, who saw himself as the legitimate president of Mexico and leader of the revolution. Initially Villa and Zapata were successful, jointly occupied Mexico City and forced Carranza and his supporters to flee to Veracruz. The tide, however, began to turn in early 1915 and culminated in Villa's defeat at the Battle of Celaya in April of that year. As a result, by October 1915 Villa was in control of only his home state of Chihuahua, which left him just the city of Juárez as a connection with the US through which he could illegally import arms.

Prior to late 1915 Villa's relations with the US had been pretty good, and at one time Villa even considered President Woodrow Wilson as "a kind of American Madero, an idealist and friend of the poor". In fact, in April 1915 Wilson issued a sharply worded statement that threatened American intervention in Mexico if the civil war were to continue; this constituted a form of indirect support for Villa, who was reeling from his defeat at Celaya as, Villa hoped, it might put an end to Carranza's advance.

As a result, Villa believed that if he managed to wrest control of the north from Carranza, the US would recognize him as president of Mexico. However, he was also running out of badly needed money with which to buy additional arms and pay his demoralized soldiers. As a result, in mid-1915 he turned to expropriating the haciendas and factories of people who had stayed out of politics so far, which meant that the revolutionaries had previously left them alone. Many of these were partly American owned. This contributed to political pressure in the US for Wilson to back Carranza. Further factors that contributed to the switch in American policy included support for Carranza from the American Federation of Labor, concern over German intelligence operations in Mexico related to World War I, Carranza's newfound commitment to protecting properties of foreigners in Mexico and the military successes of Carranza's generals. Unbeknownst to Villa, who was crossing the Sierra Madre Occidental, in October 1915 the US recognized Carranza as the president of Mexico.

However, American support for Carranza now went beyond political recognition and diplomacy. The US placed an embargo on sales of arms to Villa. More crucially, President Wilson gave his permission for Carranzista troops to cross through American territory in order to strengthen the garrison at Agua Prieta. About 3,500 fresh, veteran troops traveled through Arizona and New Mexico and arrived in the town in early October, bringing the total number of defenders to 6,500. Villa was completely unaware of this development; according to American correspondent and friend of Villa John W. Roberts, Villa believed the town was defended by only 1,200 soldiers.

Additionally, concerned about bullets and artillery shells falling over the border and the possibility of the fighting spilling to the American side, US Gen. Frederick Funston stationed three infantry regiments, some cavalry and one regiment of artillery in the cross-border town of Douglas, Arizona. While the American troops in the end did not take part in the fighting, their nearby presence would later lead Villa to believe that the Americans provided Carranza's forces with crucial logistical support, which contributed to his growing anti-Americanism.

== Battle ==
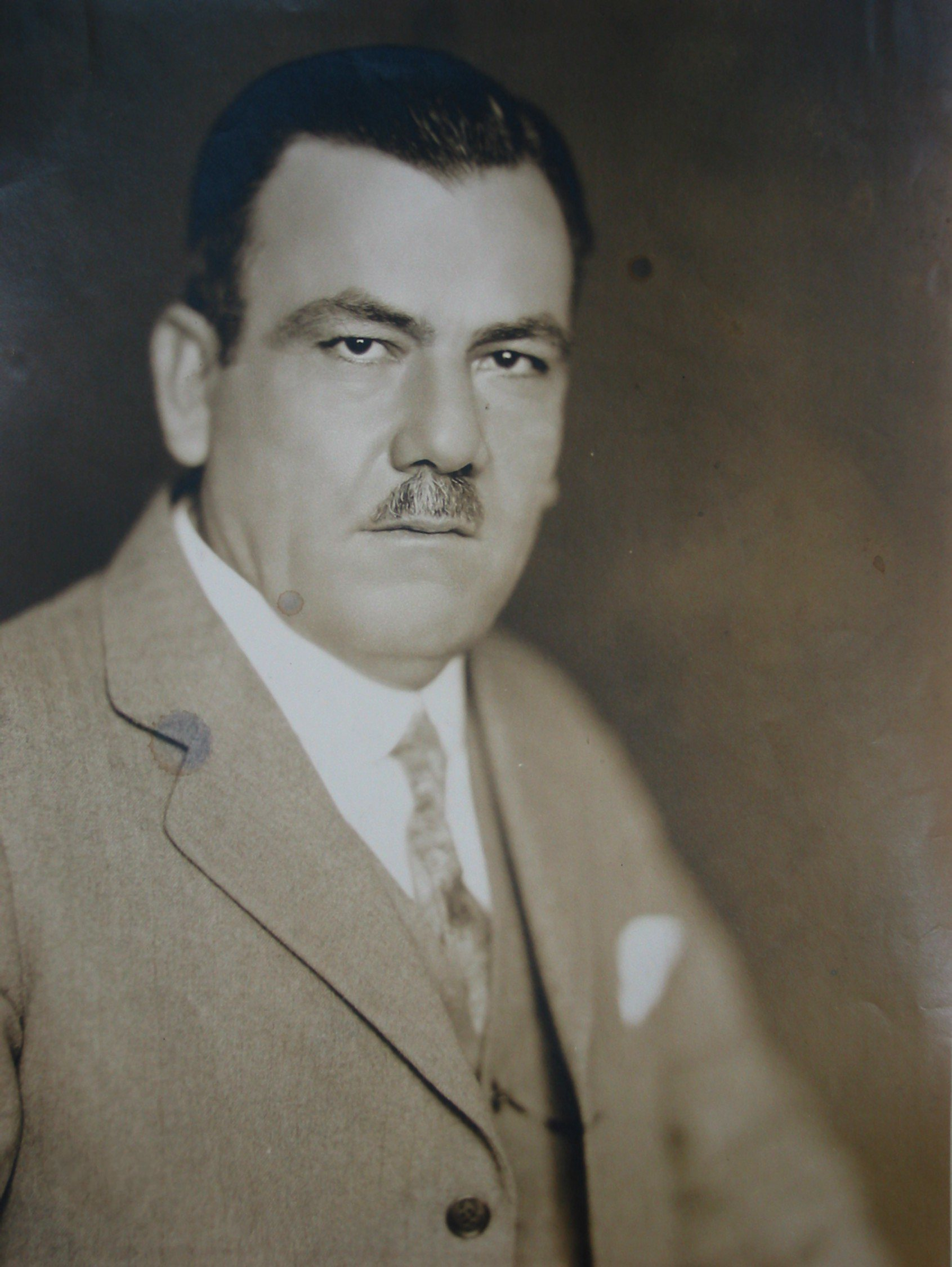
Gen. Plutarco Calles, the victor of Agua Prieta.

The defending troops at Agua Prieta were led by Gen. Plutarco Calles and many of them were veterans who had already defeated Villa at the Battle of Celaya earlier in the year. Calles, building on Gen. Alvaro Obregon's experience at Celaya, had built extensive fortifications around the city, with deep trenches, barbed wire and numerous machine gun nests.

Villa arrived at Agua Prieta on October 30, where, while giving his men a day of rest, he finally learned that the US had recognized Carranza, but he still didn't know that Carranza's reinforcements had been allowed to cross American territory to strengthen the defenses of the town. As a result, Villa still believed that a swift cavalry charge, carried out under the cover of darkness, was capable of capturing the city in one stroke. His staff officers believed that the town would be captured within five hours.

The next day Villa began his attack with an artillery barrage in the early afternoon, which only managed to detonate some of the land mines around the town that had been placed there by the Carrancistas. Once darkness has fallen he made some feints at various locations in order to hide the direction of his main attack. Shortly after midnight, on November 2, he launched his frontal assaults from the east and south of Agua Prieta.

As the Villista cavalry was charging towards the trenches, however, two searchlights illuminated the battlefield, making the horsemen an easy target for Calles' machine guns. The front trenches were manned by units led by another future president of Mexico, Col. Lázaro Cárdenas. Villa's horsemen were decimated by machine-gun fire and land mines. The few who managed to make it near the trenches encountered electrified barbed wire. The charge collapsed and the attack was a failure.

Villa wanted to continue with the cavalry charges on the following day, but his troops were ready to mutiny. He was also running low on supplies and ammunition. As a result, Villa withdrew and arrived at Naco on November 4. Even though while there, his men were given rest and supplies, more than 1,500 deserted from his army.

== Aftermath ==
While at Naco, Villa requested that several hundred of his wounded be transported by rail through the United States to Juarez, Chiahuahua, as Carranza had been allowed to transport troops and supplies; that request was denied. After resting his troops at Naco, Villa gathered up the remainder of his forces and attacked the town of Hermosillo, Sonora, on November 21, 1915. In order to try to restore the morale of his troops, he promised them that after they took the city, they could do whatever they wanted with the town and its inhabitants. This actually ended up causing the attack to fail, as his men almost immediately turned to looting and rape rather than fighting, which allowed the defending forces to reorganize and drive the Villistas out.

While most sources state that the searchlights that illuminated the battlefield for Calles' machine guns were on the Mexican side of the border, Villa strongly believed that they were on the American side. Coupled with the fact that Wilson had allowed Carranza to transport troops across Arizona, this led to a complete change in Villa's attitude towards the US. Previously, despite engaging in an occasional border raid for supplies, Villa considered himself a friend of the Americans; now he wanted revenge for what he regarded as their treachery.

As a result, in March 1916 Villa led the remains of his Division del Norte on a raid on the American town of Columbus in New Mexico. Some sources attribute the raid to American support for Carranza, while others point to the fact that some Columbus residents had cheated Villa out of money he had paid for armaments. This decision proved to be both a tactical and strategic failure; with Villa's forces were repelled by the town's defenders who inflicted heavy casualties on the already depleted revolutionaries. In turn the U.S. Army launched a punitive expedition into Mexico, led by Gen. John J. Pershing, with orders to capture or kill Villa. Though unsuccessful in apprehending Villa himself, the expedition engaged and destroyed most of what remained of Villa's army.
