= Following the Flag in Mexico =

- Written by: Carl DeForest Pryer
- Produced by: Tropical Film Company
- Starring: Pancho Villa
- Distributed by: Feinberg Amusement Corp.
- Release date: April 1916 (U.S.)
- Language: Silent

Following the Flag in Mexico (also known in the US as Following Villa in Mexico) is a 1916 silent documentary film about the Mexican Revolution.

== Production ==
The movie was partly filmed at locations in Mexico, Texas and New Mexico.

== Cast ==
- Pancho Villa as himself
- Venustiano Carranza as himself
- Frederick Funston as himself
- John J. Pershing as himself
