= The Life of General Villa =

1914 film by Christy Cabanne

- Directed by: Christy Cabanne
- Written by: Frank E. Woods
- Produced by: H.E. Aitken; Frank N. Thayer; D. W. Griffith
- Starring: Pancho Villa; Raoul Walsh
- Cinematography: Raoul Walsh
- Distributed by: Mutual Film Corporation; Mexican War Film Corp.
- Release date: May 9, 1914
- Running time: 105 minutes
- Country: United States
- Languages: Silent; English intertitles

The Life of General Villa is a 1914 American silent biographical action–drama film starring Pancho Villa as himself, shot on location during a civil war. The film incorporated both staged scenes and authentic live footage from real battles during the Mexican Revolution, around which the plot of the film revolves. The film was produced by D. W. Griffith and featured future famous director Raoul Walsh as the younger version of Villa.

Currently the film is presumably lost, with only unedited fragments and publicity stills known to exist.

The making of the film and associated events were dramatized in the film And Starring Pancho Villa as Himself (2003) with Antonio Banderas starring as Villa and Kyle Chandler playing Walsh.

== Cast ==
- Pancho Villa as Himself
- Raoul Walsh as Young Pancho Villa
- Teddy Sampson as Villa's Sister
- Irene Hunt as Villa's Sister
- Walter Long as Federal Officer
- W. E. Lawrence as Federal Officer
- Juano Hernández as Revolutionary Soldier

== Production ==
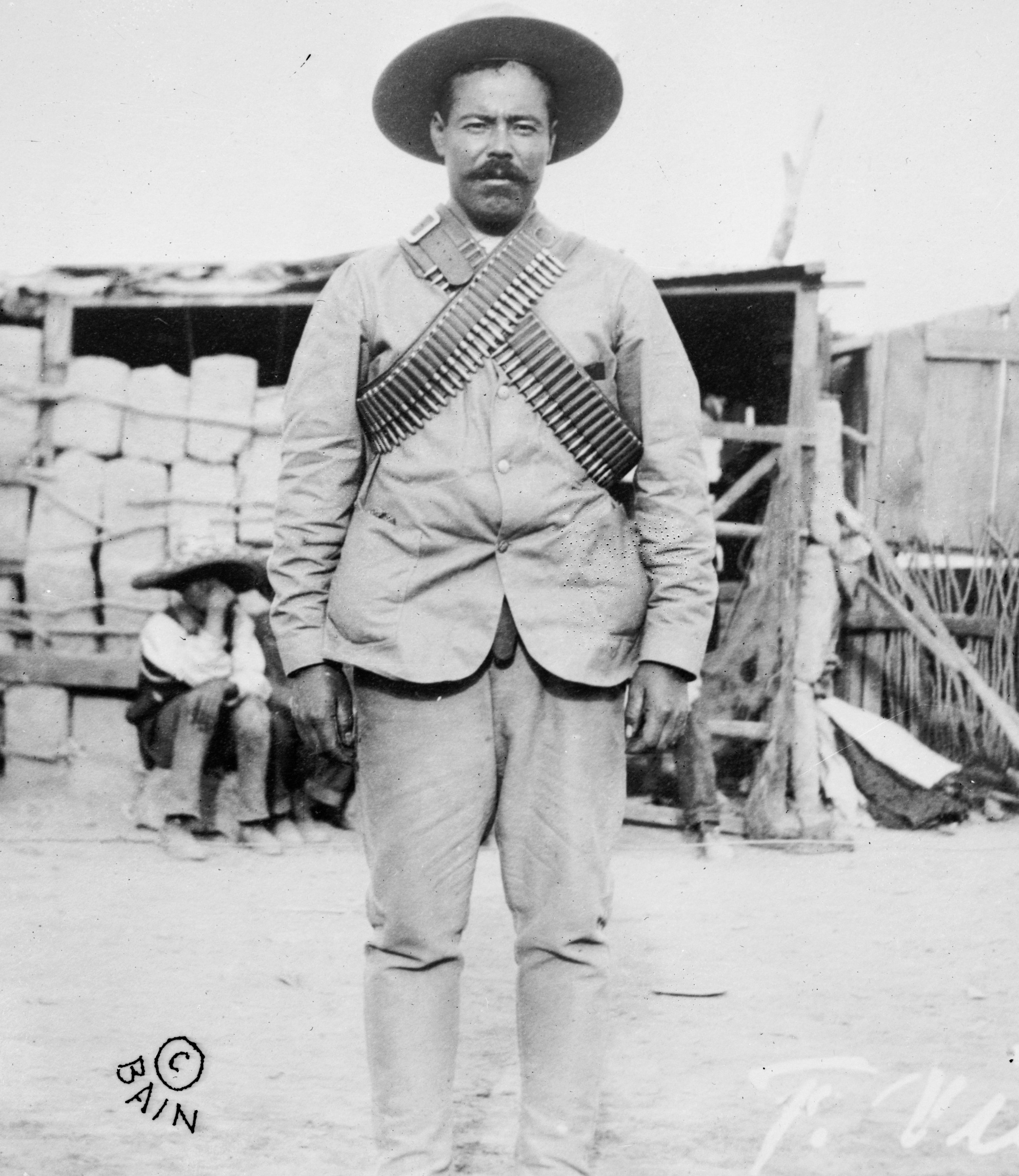
Pancho Villa

Pancho Villa's reason for starring in the movie was financial as he needed funds to help the Mexican Revolution. He eventually signed a contract with the Mutual Film Corporation where he received a $25,000 advance and was initially promised 50% (later reduced to 20%) of the profits from the film for agreeing to let the company shoot his battles in daylight, and for re-enacting them if more footage was needed. (The contract resides in a museum in Mexico City at the Archivo Federico Gonzalez Garza, folio 3057.)

Raoul Walsh wrote extensively about the experience in his autobiography Each Man in His Time, describing Villa's charisma as well as noting that peasants would knock the teeth out of corpses with rocks in the wake of firing squads in order to harvest the gold fillings, which was captured on film and had the projectionists vomiting in the screening room back in Los Angeles.

The following year, Walsh played John Wilkes Booth in Griffith's epic The Birth of a Nation and directed the early gangster movie, Regeneration, on location in the Bowery on the Lower East Side of Manhattan.

== See also ==
- List of lost films
