= Kingo Nonaka =

Japanese-Mexican combat medic and photographer

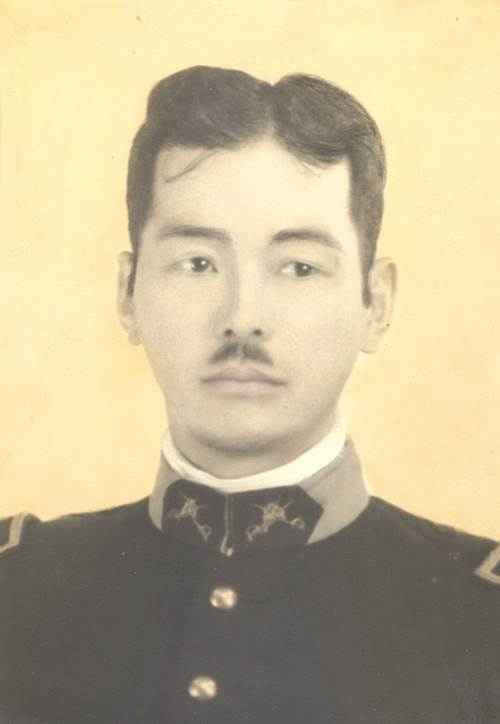
- Nonaka, December 1915
- Born: Kingo Nonaka; 2 December 1889; Fukuoka Prefecture, Kyushu, Japan
- Died: 1977 (aged 87–88); Mexico City, Mexico
- Resting place: Panteón Jardín
- Other name: José Genaro Kingo Nonaka
- Occupations: Nurse; combat medic; photographer
- Spouse: Petra García Ortega (m. 1915)
- Parents: Bunsishi Nonaka (father); Tasuyo Nonaka (mother)
- Military career
- Allegiance: Mexico
- Branch: División del Norte
- Service years: 1910–1915
- Rank: Captain
- Unit: Batallón de Sanidad
- Conflicts: Mexican Revolution; First Battle of Ciudad Juárez; Second Battle of Ciudad Juárez; Battle of Tierra Blanca; Battle of Ojinaga; Second Battle of Torreón; Battle of San Pedro de las Colonias; Battle of Paredón; Battle of Zacatecas; Battle of Celaya

Japanese name
- Kanji: 野中 金吾
- Hiragana: のなか きんご
- Katakana: ノナカ キンゴ
Transcriptions
- Romanization: Nonaka Kingo

José Genaro Kingo Nonaka (野中 金吾, Nonaka Kingo; 2 December 1889 - 1977) was a Japanese-Mexican combat medic during the Mexican Revolution and later became the first documentary photographer of Tijuana.

== Early life ==
Nonaka was born on 2 December 1889 in Fukuoka Prefecture, Kyushu, Japan, to Bunsishi Nonaka and Tasuyo Nonaka. In Japan he worked in the field and as a pearl diver. In 1906, he emigrated to Mexico with his uncle Shiotaro. They were contracted to work on the American-owned La Oaxaqueña sugar plantation in Oaxaca under harsh conditions that lead to his uncle dying of malaria shortly after arrival. Nonaka broke his contract and traveled north on foot following the rail lines on a three-month journey marked by hardship.

Denied entry into the United States at Ciudad Juárez under exclusionary laws applied to Asians, he survived as a street sweeper and janitor, often sleeping on park benches.

Bibiana Cardón, from a family of bullfighters and seed merchants, found him sleeping in a park, took him in, baptized him as José Genaro, taught him Spanish, and helped integrate him into Mexican society. He began working as a janitor at the Civil Hospital of Ciudad Juárez, where his madrina, Bibiana was employed. Here, he gained first hand nursing and surgical experience assisting the hospital's staff, eventually acquired a license to work at the infirmary, taking the Hippocratic Oath on his 21st birthday in 1910.

== Military career ==
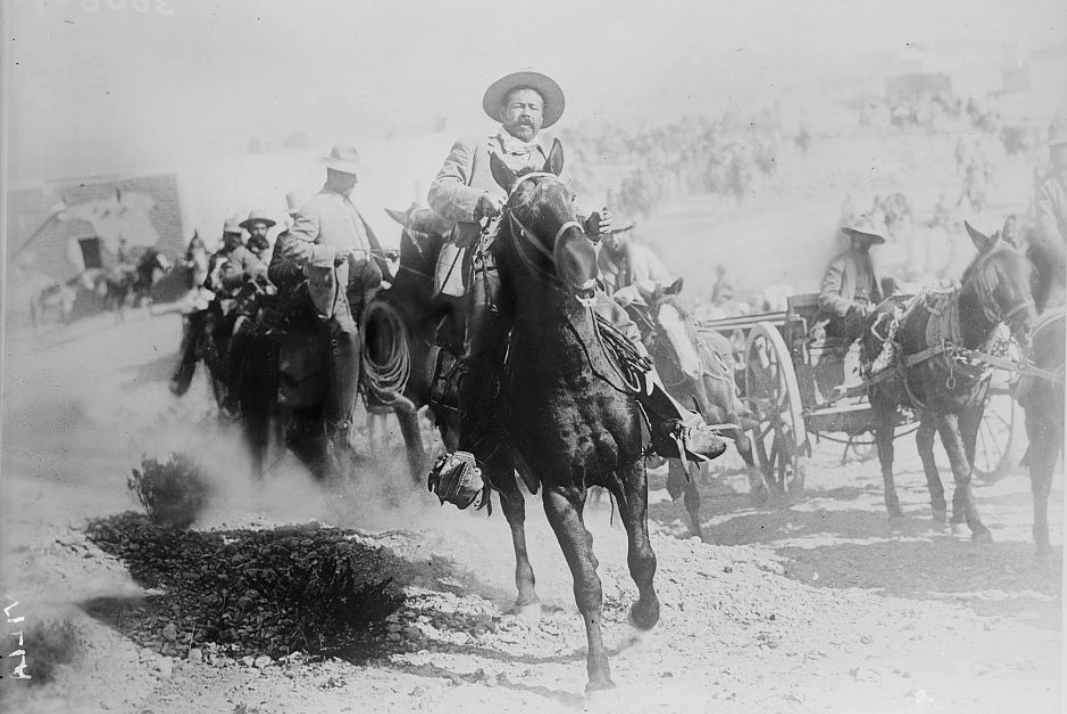
Nonaka is purportedly the man in the wagon on the right, Pancho Villa is in the center.

In March 1911, while visiting fellow Japanese immigrant, Ricardo Nakamura in Viejo Casas Grandes, he treated a man wounded by grenade shrapnel in the hand during the Battle of Casas Grandes. The patient turned out to be revolutionary leader Francisco I. Madero. Nonaka refused payment, and Madero recruited him, saying the fatherland needed people like him. Nonaka initially hesitated due to hospital duties but joined uponed Madero’s insistence, learning of his identity only after parting with his forces.

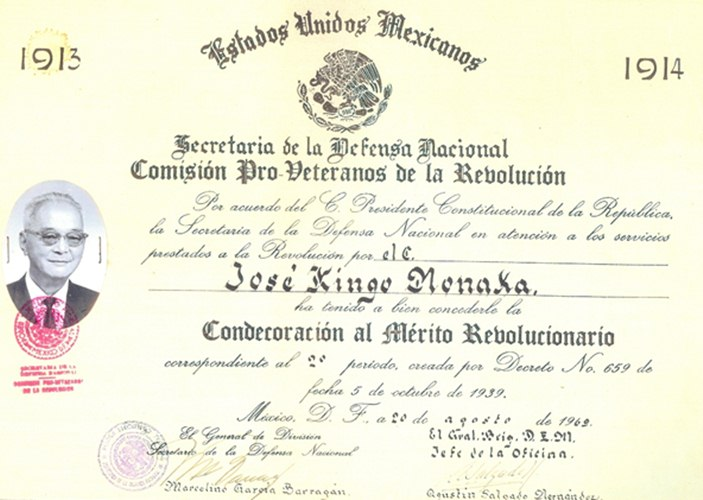
A 1939 document commending Nonaka for his service during the Mexican Revolution.

He saw direct combat in the early Fighting at Ciudad Juárez in May 1911. When many medical staff fled to El Paso, Nonaka and his godmother Bibiana Cardón organized emergency care. Madero later appointed him head of nursing at the new Military Hospital.

In 1913, after Madero’s assassination during the Ten Tragic Days, Nonaka joined Pancho Villa’s División del Norte, selected by General Máximo García as part of an 18-person medical team. He organized mobile nursing trains treating up to 2,000 wounded soldiers. He participated in major campaigns, including Chihuahua,Tierra Blanca, Ojinaga, Bermejillo, San Pedro de las Colonias, Paredón,Torreón, and Zacatecas, for a total of 14 combat operations. He rose to capitán primero in the Batallón de Sanidad and earned Villa’s praise. A historic photograph shows him driving an ambulance wagon beside Villa during the 1914 advance on Torreón.

Defeats at Celaya and León marked the end of the División del Norte as an effective and coherent fighting force. With Villa becoming a guerrilla leader, Nonaka retired from frontline duties and returned to work in Ciudad Juárez's hospitals. He continued to provide occasional services to Villa, such as in 1915 when drawing on his pearl-diving background, Nonaka dove repeatedly into the deep, murky waters of Guzmán Lagoon to recover the body of Villa's soldier, Rodolfo Fierro after he drowned. In March 1916, during the U.S. Punitive Expedition, Villa tasked him with hiding and caring for 64 wounded soldiers in a church basement in San Buenaventura, Chihuahua, with funds for protection. The local priest betrayed the group by fleeing with the money and handing them over to American forces.

== Later life ==
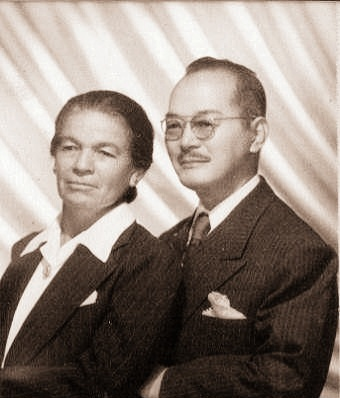
Nonaka and his spouse, Petra c. 1930.

Nonaka married nurse Petra García Ortega in 1915. They had five children. Between 1921 and 1942, they settled in Baja California. He opened two photo studios in Tijuana and became a naturalized citizen in 1924. During this era, Nonaka's photography showed a different side of the Tijuana area, which up to that point was focused on tourism. Focusing on cultural, civic, and sports events and on the changes Tijuana underwent, from small town to a larger city. He donated more than 300 photos of early Tijuana to the Archivo Histórico y la Sociedad de Historia de Tijuana.

He also worked on contract and later full-time for the Tijuana police department, including forensic photography and criminal investigation.

As a result of World War II tensions, President Lázaro Cárdenas ordered the relocation of people of Japanese ancestry from Mexico’s Pacific and northern states inland to Mexico City. Nonaka and his family complied. In Mexico City, he continued medical interests and became one of the founding members of the Instituto Nacional de Cardiología. He died in 1977 and is interred in the Panteón Jardín, Mexico City.

== See also ==
- Japanese Mexicans
- Japanese community of Mexico City
