= First Battle of Torreón =

1913 Mexican Revolution battle

- Part of the Mexican Revolution
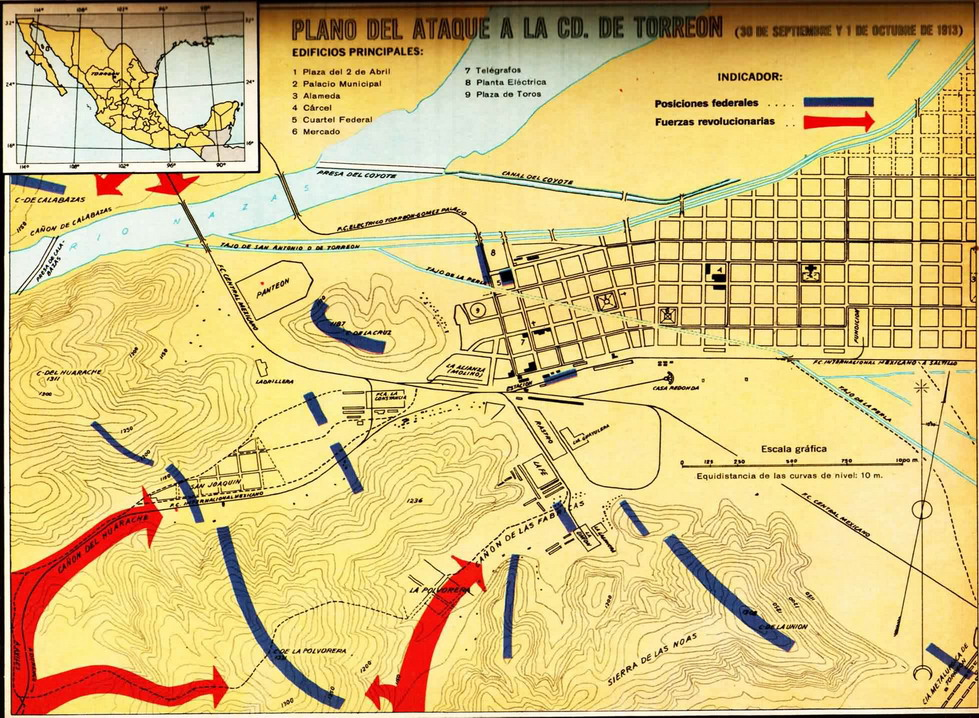
- Plan of the Battle of Torreón with the direction of attack of the revolutionaries (red arrows) and the positions of the federal troops (blue lines)
Date	27 September – 1 October 1913
Location	Torreón, Coahuila 25°32′0″N 103°26′0″W
Result	Revolutionary victory

Belligerents
Constitutionalists: División del Norte	Government: Federal Army

Commanders and leaders
Pancho Villa	Eutiquio Munguía

Strength
4,000–9,000	3,000

The First Battle of Torreon, also known as the Capture of Torreon, which lasted from September 27 to October 1, 1913, was one of the battles of the Mexican Revolution, where revolutionaries led by Pancho Villa occupied a city protected by Huertist federal forces. The victory in his first large battle of the Mexican Revolution brought Villa not only a huge increase in prestige, but also considerable spoils of war in the form of urgently needed military equipment of all kinds.

== Background ==
The first phase of the revolution, which began in 1910, ended with the victory of the revolutionaries: President Porfirio Díaz, who resigned in 1911, was later replaced by the revolutionary Francisco Ignacio Madero. However, in early 1913, with the help of the betrayal of Victoriano Huerta, the followers of the old system murdered Madero, and Huerta became the new president. Against him, a nationwide coalition developed among former revolutionaries, the main commander of the antihuertist movement in Chihuahua was Pancho Villa, although it was Governor Venustiano Carranza of Coahuila who appointed himself commander-in-chief of the entire uprising.

Villa returned to Mexico with only 8 companions from the United States in the spring, but as the months passed, more and more people joined him and acquired more and more weapons. A series of military successes over the federalists, paired with "publicly effective" acts of "social justice", for example in the form of confiscations of goods from the large landowning families, above all those of the Terrazas-Creel family clan, which was hated in Chihuahua, made his popularity rise sharply among the population. Since Villa deliberately avoided the possessions of US citizens from these measures, he also secured the attention and benevolence of various representatives of the United States, who in his case indicated an increasing willingness not to handle the arms embargo imposed on the Mexican rebels so strictly as usual.

After fighting a few battles, the Villistas decided to attack Torreón. Torreón was a young, modern city of nearly 30,000 inhabitants on the border of Coahuila and the state of Durango, on the banks of the Nazas River, almost merging with Gómez Palacio and Lerdó in Durango on the other side of the river. In addition to being an important railway junction, it was also of great importance for cotton production and processing.

The urban agglomeration, led by Eutiquio Munguía, was originally defended by a garrison of about 3,500 federal soldiers and the associated Orozquista irregular red-flag troops. However, Munguía, led by General Ocaranza, sent many people in the direction of Monterrey to pave the way for the 650-strong reinforcement ordered by Huerta from Saltillo under Albert Trucy, who also brought half a million rounds of ammunition and 1,200 grenades. The forces of Ocaranza, however, were forced to stop by smaller opponents, and reinforcements could not get there in time either. When the battle began, they were still more than 200 km from Torreón.

Villa and his 1,100 men set off from Jiménez by horse, train and car and then stopped at Bermejillo. Here they were joined by the armies of Maclovio Herrera and Tomás Urbina, and then additional volunteers joined them. They soon arrived at La Goma hacienda on the left bank of the Nazas, southwest of the cities, where on September 26 Villa and Calixto Contreras began discussing plans for the attack. It was decided that Villa and Urbina would head northeast on the Torreonian side of the river, and Herrera on the other bank, Gómez Palacio and Lerdo. Therefore, Urbina and Villa crossed the Nazas, but the strong current tore the rope of the ferry, bringing it along with the cargo swept away by the river (including the car).

On September 27, the revolutionaries occupied the hometown of Santísima Trinidad de la Loma de España (La Loma for short), formerly abandoned by its owners, where Villa convened the leaders of his army and representatives of the local revolutionaries in La Laguna: Urbina, Herrera, Toribio Ortegát, Eugenio Aguirre Benavidest, José Isabel Robles, Orestes Pereyra, Calixto Contreras, and Juan E. García. Those gathered elected Villa Pancho as the commander-in-chief of the emerging Northern Division. According to various opinions, the total number of the revolutionary army had reached 4,000-9,000 by this time. They had four 75 mm guns.

== The battle ==
With the thousands of men who were now subordinate to him, Villa commanded one of the largest revolutionary armies that had been set up so far. Nevertheless, the risk of the planned military operation was not inconsiderable. Villa had neither the experience necessary to command such a large armed force, nor as a guerrilla leader had he had the opportunity to try out regular warfare; The fighters under him from Durango and the basin called La Laguna, in which the target was located, were notorious for their indiscipline, which was one of the reasons that Venustiano Carranza's attempt had already failed to conquer the city in July 1913. Above all, Villa lacked a crucial prerequisite for taking a well-fortified city like Torreón: He only had a few guns and hardly any trained artillerymen to operate them.

General Eutiquio Munguía, who commanded the Torreón garrison of around 3,000 men, including 1,000 militiamen and Orozquistas, looked forward to the coming events with some calm. He had a clearly superior artillery, which he had stationed on the heights that dominated the entrances to Torreón. In this way - according to his plan - the attackers would be targeted under fire while they were approaching the city and their attack would be brought to a standstill. He also knew that a second army of the federalists had been marched from Chihuahua, which would finally take hold of the attackers, who had already been weakened by the unsuccessful onslaught, and destroy them. What Munguía had not included in his calculation, however, was that his troops consisted to a large extent of conscripted recruits from Mexico's deep south, who were well acquainted with the terrain, while the opponents he faced were highly motivated and filled with revolutionary vigor in a completely foreign terrain.

On the Lerdó side, Emilio Campa's red troops had already started shooting while the rally was still ongoing. On September 28, Maclovio Herrera's troops set off on that shore ran them out in a four-hour battle that began at 10 a.m., taking 18 prisoners who were immediately shot dead. On the morning of September 29, on the coast of Torreón (about 20 km southwest of the city), the Villistas also clashed with the Confederates, led by General Alvírez. He was sent by Munguía with 550 men and two cannons to investigate the situation. When the revolutionaries learned of Alvírez's armies, Villa and his men rushed forward, covering them from Urbina's side, while Aguirre Benavides and Domingo Yuriar's units remained behind. Villa's cavalry stormed the village of Avilés, where Alvírez's people were: the revolutionaries won in half an hour. Villa's two officers, Joaquín Vargas and Pedro Ortega, also killed Alvírez and his staff. Of the Confederates, 467 or 487 lost their lives, 25 (including 6 officers) were taken prisoner, and the rest returned to Torreón around one o'clock in the afternoon. Of the prisoners, those who were willing to switch to the insurgents survived, the others were executed. The revolutionaries acquired two Allied cannons, as well as 532 7-mm Mauser rifles, 150,000 rounds, and 360 grenades.

At the same time, the units of Herrera and Campa clashed on the other side, the latter opening the locks of the reservoirs of Tlahualilo to stop the revolutionaries by flooding Nazas. The forces of Herrera then spent a lot of time repairing the locks, so they didn't get to the scene at the beginning of the attack on Torreón, which began on September 30.

Villa divided his army into two parts, one led by Aguirre Benavides and Yuriar, the other by Ortega. They set off in the canyons between the mountains towards the city around 3 to 5 p.m., and soon reached the first lines of defense. They did not engage in open battle, but rather wanted to put pressure on and grind the defense. Meanwhile, a fighter name Gutiérrez Galindo attacked the defenders of Casa Colorada, but his horse was killed, his leg injured and isolated from his comrades. He cut out the belly of the horse carcass and climbed into it and hid it until the next day until his companions occupied Casa Colorada.

Villa waited for the night at the entrance to Huarache Canyon, and then they began to move slowly. To distinguish his men, he ordered them to indicate their affiliation without a hat, with their right sleeves folded up to their elbows. They occupied several peaks at night, but in the early hours of the morning, the defenders launched a counterattack and regained some positions. In the morning, the Reds, led by Benjamín Argumedo, attacked the Cerro de la Polvareda peak, but the Villistas fired at them with a machine gun, so they had to retreat. Since the people of Campa on the other side were also defeated, Mungua did not have much opportunity left. Villa immediately ordered an attack on the city, and together with Herrera, who joined him, they soon reached the train station. The defense collapsed permanently by 9 p.m.

== Aftermath ==
At 2 a.m. on October 2, Villa was greeted with music in the city. Although the defenders tried to destroy as much equipment as possible on their escape so that it did not fall into the hands of the revolutionaries, the spoils of war were still very significant. Plenty of weapons (including 5 machine guns and 11 cannons, including giant cannons called Rorro and El Niño) and about half a million rounds of ammunition were acquired, as well as quite a few trains (39 locomotives and several wagons).

Among the prisoners to be executed were 8 Spanish settlers. A woman named Guadalupe Cervantes begged Villa for their lives, but Villa replied that all "gachupín" (Spanish) should be shot in the head, not just these eight. The woman desperately went to the scene of the execution and cried, trying to persuade them to switch to the Villistas. In the end, it was thanks to this that they were left alive. But there were many more prisoners than there, most of whom were indeed awaiting execution. Five hundred prisoners were gathered in Avilés and then the soldiers were separated (offered to join the revolutionaries) and 167 officers and red warriors. They were shot one by one by Rodolfo Fierro and Pablo C. Seáñez, but only reached 10-12 when they were ordered not to kill the prisoners for now, because there would be some of them who would switch. In the end, about 100 of them were killed. Villa tried to prevent the looting after the victory by shooting the looters to death (only two streets, 10-15 shops were looted), but he himself forcibly forced "loans" from wealthy landlords in the area, which he then partly spent on his own army and partly distributed, for example to hospitals.

The loser Munguía, who fled to Matamoros, Tamaulipas, was later brought to military court in Mexico City for trial. In his defense, he brought up the fact that the Spanish settlers of the city (who had supported them until then) began to flee and dragged with them the soldiers who had already lost their enthusiasm.

After this action, Villa's army turned north again to continue the fight against the federalists, who still had large numbers of troops stationed here in various garrisons. In Torreón, Villa only left a small crew behind, which was insufficient to prevent Huerta's troops from retaking the city a few months later.

== Bibliography ==
- Janssens, Joe Lee (2016). Maneuver and Battle in the Mexican Revolution. A Revolution in Military Affairs. Vol. 1: 1913. Houston: Revolution Publishing. pp. 227–239. ISBN 978-0996478908.
- Katz, Friedrich (1998). The life and times of Pancho Villa. Stanford: Stanford University Press. ISBN 0-8047-3046-6.
- McLynn, Frank (2001). Villa and Zapata. A History of the Mexican Revolution. London: Random House. ISBN 978-0-7126-6677-0.
- Taibo, Paco Ignacio (2007). Pancho Villa: Una biografía narrativa (in Spanish) (1st ed.). Barcelona: Editorial Planeta. ISBN 9788408073147. OCLC 433362298.
