= Battle of San Andrés =

1913 battle of the Mexican Revolution

- Part of the Mexican Revolution
Date	August 26–27, 1913
Location	San Andrés, Chihuahua
Result	Revolutionary victory

Belligerents
Constitutionalists: División del Norte	Government: Federal Army

Commanders and leaders
Pancho Villa; Rodolfo Fierro; Julio Cárdenas (WIA); E.L Holmdahl (WIA)	Unknown

Strength
2,500	3,000

Casualties and losses
Unknown	1,000 killed 400 executed

The Battle of San Andrés, also known as the Charge at San Andrés, took place during the Mexican Revolution and was fought on August 26–27, 1913. Revolutionary leader General Pancho Villa attacked the town of San Andrés, and the battle concluded when the American soldier of fortune charged the federal positions and routed the enemy. A thousand government soldiers were killed, and 400 prisoners were executed by Villa's self styled executioner, Rodolfo Fierro.

== Battle ==
Throughout the summer of 1913, Villa was at the peak of his success, winning battles against president Victoriano Huerta and his army. His infamous division of the north had a strength of almost 50,000 troops, loyal only to Villa. Although Venustiano Carranza was the nominal leader of the revolt, it was Villa and his men who did most of the fighting. In short order, Villa had captured Guerrero, Bustillos, and Casas Grandes.

In August 1913, Villa stationed his army outside the town of San Andrés and launched his attack on the 26th. Villa dispatched the head of his bodyguard and commander of the "Dorados", Julio Cárdenas, to lead the assault with the infantry. The fighting lasted all day and the rebels were unable to force their way into the city because of effective fire from the federal artillery. Cárdenas was wounded, and he and his men had to withdraw to the safety of the rebel lines.

In next day on the 27th, Villa ordered his machine gun detachments under the command of the American soldier of fortune, Major E.L Holmdahl. Holmdahl's men formed a firing line and began bombarding the enemy trenches. But at nightfall, Villa ordered one of his famous cavalry charges. As Cárdenas had been wounded, Villa assigned Holmdahl to lead the attack. Holmdahl ordered a subordinate to command his machine guns, while he rode to the front of the column to commence the charge. The bugler sounded the charge. As the Dorados charged into the mouths of the cannons shouting "Viva Villa", Holmdahl, one hand on the reins, the other on his .45 caliber revolver, shouted and charged the Huertistas. His hat was shot off by a shell fragment during the charge.

As the Dorados were nearing the trenches, Holmdahl was suddenly shot in the stomach and fell off his horse to the ground. Holmdahl was wounded, but the cavalry reached the federal positions and quickly overran the trenches and routed the enemy from the field. The federals had lost with 1,000 dead and 400 captured, as well as losing more than fifty artillery pieces, 400 Mauser rifles, 20,000 rounds of ammunition and seven railroad trains loaded with food, medical supplies, and uniforms.

The glory of victory was soured with the brutal murders of captured troops. According to one of Villa's wives, Luz Corral, Orozco sympathizers had poisoned her daughter. Outraged, Villa turned the prisoners over to his executioner, Rodolfo Fierro. Fierro lined up more than four hundred helpless prisoners in groups of three. Forcing them to hug each other back-to-front, Fierro then strode down their lines firing one shot from a high-powered pistol into each trio, fatally drilling all three bodies in a single shot. Fierro would giggle to Villa "Look how much ammunition I saved."

== Aftermath ==
The battle resulted in the victory for Villa and his men. Holmdahl, for his part, was promoted to Colonel only at the age of 29, and later awarded an honorary legion of honor. A contemporary pamphlet described Holmdahl's charge as heroic and bold, noting that his courage should be memorialized in marble and bronze. Martín Luis Guzmán, a Mexican Journalist, novelist, and historian credited Holmdahl with winning the battle.

== Sources ==
- Meed, Douglas (2003). Soldier of Fortune: Adventuring in Latin America and Mexico with Emil Lewis Holmdahl. Houston, Texas: Halycon Press Ltd. ISBN 1931823057.
- Guzmán, Luis Guzmán. Memoirs of Pancho Villa.
- "Victorias Del General Villa" (Victories With General Villa) T.F. Serrano and C. Del Vando. El Paso, Texas, 1913.
