= José Inés Salazar =

Mexican general and revolutionary (1884–1917)

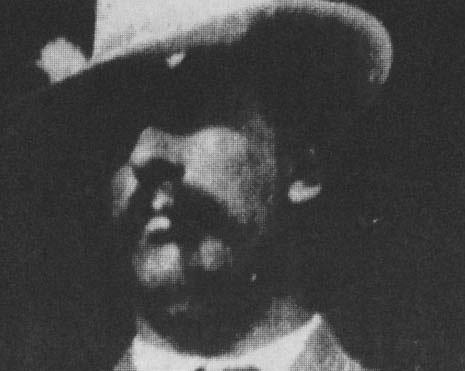
General José Inés Salazar, 1915.

José Inés Salazar (1884 – 9 August 1917) was a Mexican revolutionary general who led the Orozquistas during the Mexican Revolution and later fought with Pancho Villa. He was a native of Casas Grandes, Chihuahua.

== Compagnion of Pascual Orozco ==
Salazar was a good friend of Pascual Orozco and in 1909, they were reported to be involved in arms running. Prior to the Mexican Revolution he was a member of the Partido Liberal Mexicano. When Francisco I. Madero called for an armed revolt against the government of Porfirio Díaz in November 1910, Salazar and Orozco joined the cause. They and Pancho Villa were responsible for the early victories against federal forces in the winter of 1910–1911. Their biggest victory was the taking of Ciudad Juarez in May 1911, which ultimately led to the collapse of the Díaz government.

== Fight against new Government ==
With the ousting of Porfirio Díaz in May 1911, an interim government was formed to hold new elections in October. In July, Francisco Madero formed a new political party to run for the presidency. However, his moderate liberal views alienated many of his more radical supporters. Two of these, Francisco and Emilio Vazquez-Gomez attempted to gather support for an opposition. When it became apparent that Madero would win the October election, the Vazquez-Gomez brothers began organising a new uprising claiming that Madero had betrayed the spring revolution. This revolt attracted several dissatisfied northern warriors of the spring revolution, including José Salazar. Hostilities reached a peak in October 1911. Salazar took part in this 1912 rebellion in collaboration with Emilio Campa as a result of Madero's failure to give him an appointment as the police commissioner in Casas Grande.

Pascual Orozco continued to support Madero though, and in January 1912 he was able to contain the Vazquez-Gomez movement, both militarily and because of his popularity. However, in March 1912 Orozco also became disenchanted with Madero, and he defected and joined with his old friend Salazar once again. That month, Salazar defeated the Federal garrison at Santa Rosalia. In April he forced Francisco "Pancho" Villa and Maclovio Herrera out of Hidalgo del Parral. After this battle he lost control of his troops, and they started looting the city. This behaviour had strong repercussions. Public sentiment turned against Orozco and Salazar and their Colorados. They also received strong condemnation from the American press when Salazar allowed a captured soldier-of-fortune, American Thomas Fountain to be executed for fighting for Villa.

== Orozquista General ==
In 1912 as part of their campaign of "Mexico for Mexicans" Orozco and Salazar ordered the Mormons to leave their colonies in Chihuahua and Sonora. In September 1912, one of Salazar's battalions was routed in the Battle of San Joaquin, Sonora, by a battalion commanded by Lt. Colonel Alvaro Obregón.

In February 1913, a right-wing coup overthrew the Madero government, and Victoriano Huerta became president. Soon he offered amnesty to the Orozco rebels who were still active at this time. Orozco and his lieutenants including Salazar agreed to cease fighting against the central government in exchange for paid positions as Mexican irregular forces. In November 1913, Salazar commanded a brigade under General Francisco Castro defending Ciudad Juarez. On the 15th, they were attacked and driven out of Ciudad Juárez by Pancho Villa. Salazar was able to retreat south to Ciudad Chihuahua. On 23 November General Salvador Mercado ordered him to lead a force against Villa and retake Ciudad Juárez, this encounter was later to be called the Battle of Tierra Blanca. Salazar had superior artillery for support, but the next morning his army was overwhelmed by coordinated attack of Villa's cavalry and Rodolfo Fierro's men exploding materials in the army's rearward positions.

In January 1914 Mercado and Salazar were again attacked by Pancho Villa, this time at the border town Ojinaga, Chihuahua. Both were defeated and forced across the river to Presidio, Texas. There they were arrested by the American army and interned at Fort Bliss. Salazar was charged with smuggling munitions into Mexico. A Federal jury in Santa Fe, New Mexico, acquitted him in May 1914, but he was then taken to a detention camp at Fort Wingate to face charges of violating American neutrality laws. There he retained the legal services of famous gunfighter and attorney Elfego Baca. Salazar was scheduled to go on trial in Albuquerque late November 1914 but on the 20th, just a few days before his trial, he was able to arrange a daring escape. In April 1915, his attorney Baca was charged with masterminding this getaway.

== Back to Revolution ==
Salazar was next seen in El Paso in early December 1914, crossing over into Mexico. For the next 6 months, he was active in Chihuahua attempting to organize a counterrevolution against the government of Venustiano Carranza. This movement was led by former head of state Victoriano Huerta and his supporter Pascual Orozco but the arrest of both in late June 1915 thwarted the plan. Salazar returned to New Mexico in July 1915 on his own behalf, and surrendered there to law enforcement authorities. He spent nearly five months in solitary confinement at the penitentiary in Santa Fe. A federal jury acquitted him of perjury charges on 9 December 1915, and Salazar left solitary confinement. He immediately returned to Mexico.

== Fighting with Pancho Villa ==
With Huerta and Orozcon deceased, Carranza's federal soldiers captured and imprisoned Salazar in May 1916 in Ciudad Chihuahua, but in September Pancho Villa raided the town once more and released all the prisoners. Salazar then joined rebel Villa's forces. In November Villa learned that federal soldiers are advancing north to confront him. He ordered his subordinate south to delay the attacking federals. With 3,000 men Salazar engaged 8,000 federal troops. Although defeated, he was able to retreat in good order. In December 1916, Villa and Salazar attacked and took the city of Torreón. They captured large amounts of supplies and succeeded in extracting substantial amounts of money from the local merchants and foreign companies in the city.

By April 1917 José Inés Salazar was one of Villa's most trusted Lieutenants, and was in command of over one thousand men. However, he was finally killed in action on August 9, 1917 outside of Nogales Hacienda, Chihuahua.
