= Battle of Zaragoza (1913) =

Coordinates: 31.648368°N 106.356542°W

- Part of the Mexican Revolution
Date	Late November, 1913
Location	Zaragoza, near Ysleta, Texas
Result	Revolutionary victory

Belligerents
Constitutionalists: División del Norte	Government: Federal Army

Commanders and leaders
E.L Holmdahl (WIA)	Unknown

Strength
40	200

Casualties and losses
Unknown	172 killed 28 executed

The Battle of Zaragoza took place during the Mexican Revolution in late November 1913, a few days after the Battle of Tierra Blanca. Pancho Villa's trusted commander, the American soldier of fortune, E.L Holmdahl attacked the camp of a group of Huertist who were raiding rebel territory from the US. Holmdahl, despite being outnumbered, attacked and trapped the enemy, killing 172 while the remaining 28 were executed by his men against Holmdahl's orders.

== Battle ==
A few days after the Battle of Tierra Blanca, Villa's subordinate, the American soldier of fortune E.L Holmdahl, led a patrol of forty mounted men through the desert south east of Juárez, searching for a band of Huerta troops who were raiding Villa's supply lines. Based in the Texas border town of Ysleta, fifteen miles east of EL Paso, the band crossed the Rio Grande into Mexico on daring raid and then fled back to safety in Texas.

Holmdahl was tipped off to the whereabouts of the raiders by a US army officer, an old comrade in the 20th Infantry Regiment now stationed in El Paso. With this information, Holmdahl was able to slip up on the group's camp at dawn, near the town of Zaragoza and, although there were at least 200 federals, Holmdahl struck hard and fast.

By positioning his men between the Federal camp and the river, Holmdahl's surprise attack cut off the enemies escape route and scattered most of the bands towards the river town of Zaragoza. Riding into town, Holmdahl was hit with a rifle bullet entering the top of his shoulder blade near the base of his neck and coming out beneath the shoulder blade. Knocked out of the saddle, Holmdahl watched his men shoot many of the raiders and capture 28 of them, while the remaining 172 were killed in the engagement. His, believing their commander dead, lined the prisoners against an adobe building wall and shot them.

== Aftermath ==
The wounded Holmdahl was taken to El Paso, where under the care of American doctors, he recovered and returned to the front.

== Sources ==
- Meed, Douglas (2003). Soldier of Fortune: Adventuring in Latin America and Mexico with Emil Lewis Holmdahl. Houston, Texas: Halycon Press Ltd.
- Guzmán, Luis Guzmán. Memoirs of Pancho Villa.
- Chisholm, Hugh, ed. (1911). "Chihuahua (city)" . Encyclopædia Britannica. Vol. 6 (11th ed.). Cambridge University Press.
