= Battle of Ciudad Juárez =

The Battle of Ciudad Juárez may refer to:

- Battle of Ciudad Juárez (1911)
- Battle of Ciudad Juárez (1913)
- Battle of Ciudad Juárez (1919)
