= Villa Rides =

1968 Western war film by Buzz Kulik

- Theatrical release poster
- Directed by: Buzz Kulik
- Screenplay by: Robert Towne; Sam Peckinpah
- Story by: William Douglas Lansford (Adaptation)
- Based on: Pancho Villa by William Douglas Lansford
- Produced by: Ted Richmond
- Starring: Yul Brynner; Robert Mitchum; Grazia Buccella; Herbert Lom; Robert Viharo; Charles Bronson
- Cinematography: Jack Hildyard
- Edited by: David Bretherton
- Music by: Maurice Jarre
- Production company: Paramount Pictures
- Distributed by: Paramount Pictures
- Release date: May 29, 1968 (Colorado)
- Running time: 125 minutes
- Country: United States
- Language: English
- Box office: $1.2 million (US/Canada rentals)

Villa Rides is a 1968 American Technicolor Western war film in Panavision directed by Buzz Kulik and starring Yul Brynner as Mexican revolutionary Pancho Villa and Robert Mitchum as an American adventurer and pilot of fortune. The screenplay is based on the biography by William Douglas Lansford. The supporting cast includes Charles Bronson as Fierro, Herbert Lom as Huerta, and Alexander Knox as Madero.

== Plot ==
Lee Arnold has to land his biplane unexpectedly in Mexico due to technical difficulties, and he hears both the Mexican army and the local peasant view on Pancho Villa—one seeing him as an outlaw, the other as a hero.

A local family takes him in and repairs his plane, and Arnold finds the daughter Fina attractive. Mexican soldiers arrive and beat the men and rape the daughter. The father is taken to the village square and is to be hanged alongside a handful of other men, allegedly for helping Villa. Captain Ramirez chastises the crowd as he kicks the supporting stools from beneath each man in turn. He is interrupted by the father humming "La Cucaracha", and the crowd joins in the refrain. Suddenly, though, a Maxim gun starts firing from a rooftop into the soldiers, but the father is not rescued from death. It is Pancho Villa and his men.

Villa is puzzled by Arnold's presence. He discovers that he has been running guns to the soldiers and whips him with his money belt. Arnold is placed with the Colorados, the junior Mexican soldiers (the seniors have already been hung). They create a game where one of Villa's men, Fierro (Bronson), tries to shoot them as they run in small groups to try to escape over a wall... all in the test are killed. Arnold tries to persuade Villa both to quit the game and make use of his plane. Villa lets one soldier escape and kills the rest.

At night, the men taunt the daughter (Fina) and one gets shot and is told "where are your manners... go outside to die". Arnold explains she was raped earlier that day. Villa asks for a priest and marries her.

The next day, Arnold is asked to give a flying demonstration and teach Villa how to fly. Despite being a two-seater, Villa goes off alone and manages a few seconds in the air without killing himself, and his men all cheer his success.

The next day, Arnold takes Fierro up in the plane, but he does not like it. They spot a troop train and the next day, with the help of the plane, they ambush the train.

In the evening, Villa marries another girl and explains he does it just to please them, as "women like to get married". He explains he has married 11 times. The daughter goes to Arnold for solace.

Villa is granted an audience with Don Luis, the presidential leader of the revolution. They plan a major battle at Conejos. Villa leads a far larger group in an attack on a fortress there, fording a wide river. A barbed wire barrier halts them. Behind the lines, Arnold and Fierro prepare the plane. As the rebels retreat, the army launches a cavalry charge across the river (the barbed wire mysteriously disappears) armed with sabers. They are halted by Arnold in the plane and driven back to the barbed wire. The plane crashes in the river, but the retreat of the army allows the revolutionaries to charge forward, and the barbed wire is wrecked by the army horses. Villa gains the outer perimeter of the town, but a steep slope must be climbed to reach the town walls. They use bombs to breach the wall. They reach the general and his aides, but Ramirez escapes and hides down a well. They toss a bomb down in a bucket to kill him.

The town is captured, but the leader of the revolutionary army, General Huerta, orders Villa's arrest. When Arnold goes to General Huerta to compensate him for the lost plane, he is also arrested, as Huerta has discovered the plane was stolen, and he wishes to maintain good relations with the United States. Villa and Arnold share a cell and debate their morals.

Villa is drummed out at dawn to be shot, but he demands Captain Fuentes that he be shot by his own men. After a delay, he is again about to be shot, but Huerta stops it, as he has received a telegram ordering Villa to go to Mexico City. The telegram is part of a ruse set up by Fierro.

Meanwhile, Arnold is being escorted to the border in a car with three officers. He persuades them to detour to say goodbye to Fina. He is more interested in stealing money stashed to fund the revolution. Fina is crestfallen.

In El Paso in a barber shop, Arnold is told the revolutionary president Madero was assassinated and Huerta is now president. Villa has escaped from prison.

In the final scene, Arnold is wining and dining a girl in a restaurant, when Villa enters with Fierro and his aide. He is asked to rejoin the revolution. Villa plans to capture Mexico City. As they cross the border, Arnold flies over, too.

The epilogue pronounces Villa's successful capture of Mexico City six months later at the head of a revolutionary army of 50,000.

== Cast ==
- Yul Brynner as Pancho Villa
- Robert Mitchum as Lee Arnold
- Maria Grazia Buccella as Fina
- Charles Bronson as Rodolfo Fierro
- Herbert Lom as General Victoriano Huerta
- Robert Viharo as Urbina
- Frank Wolff as Ramirez
- Alexander Knox as President Francisco Madero
- Diana Lorys as Emilita
- Robert Carricart as Don Luis
- Fernando Rey as Fuentes
- José María Prada as Major
- Antoñito Ruiz as Juan
- Jill Ireland as Marsha
- Seyyal Taner as Guerrilla Girl
- Regina de Julián as Lupita
- Andrés Monreal as Captain Herrera

== Production ==
Sam Peckinpah wrote the original script and was set to direct, but Brynner disliked Peckinpah's harsh depiction of Villa and had Robert Towne rewrite the script, with Kulik brought on as director. Towne later said he did this as a favor for Robert Evans, head of Paramount, and hated the experience.

This film marked the first of many appearances by Jill Ireland in films with her future husband, Charles Bronson, though her part in Villa Rides is brief.

== Reception ==
=== Critical response ===
Chicago Sun-Times film critic Roger Ebert gave the film a mixed review, writing, "You would think an interesting picture could be made about Pancho Villa and the Mexican Revolution, a subject most Americans know next to nothing about. But we learn nothing except that Pancho was a romantic fellow who had a mustache and liked to have people lined up three in a row and killed with one bullet. (That scene, incidentally, got a big laugh.) Frankly, this kind of movie is beginning to get to me. You can enjoy one, maybe, or two. Or you can enjoy a particularly well done shoot-em-up. But the Loop has been filled with one action-adventure after another for the last month, and if Villa Rides is not the worst, it is certainly not the best."

Film critic A. H. Weiler wrote, "Yul Brynner, Robert Mitchum, cavalry, politicos, and even the faint strains of "La Cucaracha" fail to disguise the fact that Villa Rides, which dashed into the Forum Theater yesterday, is simply a sprawling Western and not history. As such, it incessantly fills the screen with the din of pistols and rifles, and assorted warfare and wenching, shot in sharp color on rugged Spanish sites that strikingly simulate Mexico. Any resemblance to the 1912-1914 campaigns of the bandit-revolutionary in the cause of liberal President Madero and against General Huerta is purely coincidental."

== See also ==
- List of American films of 1968
