= Lester P. Barlow =

American engineer & inventor (1886 - 1967)

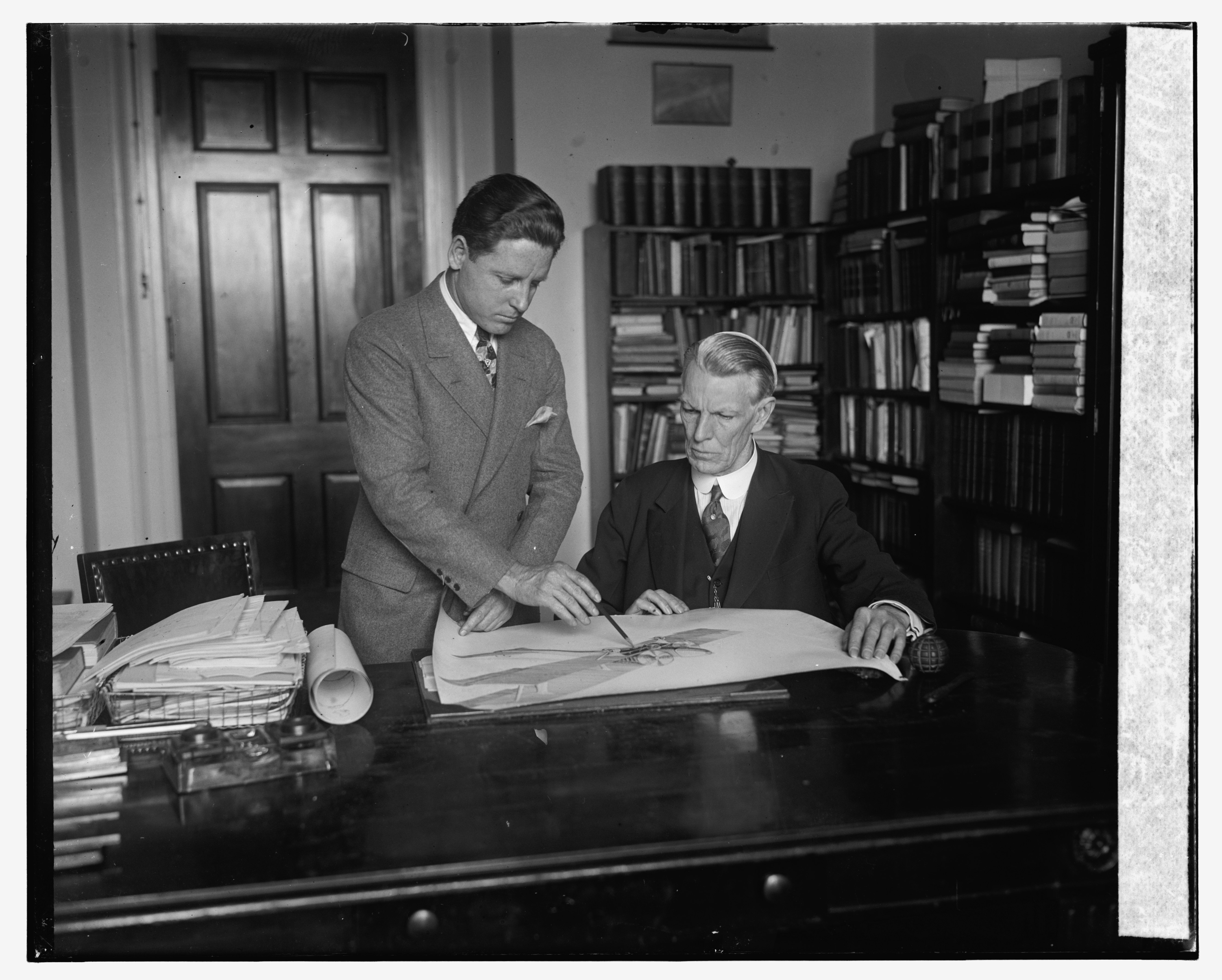
Lester P. Barlow (left) with Rep. Charles F. Curry (right), 1926

Lester Pence Barlow (2 December 1886 – 6 September 1967) was an American inventor and engineer, known for his work on explosives.

Born in Monticello in the US State of Wisconsin, he spent much of his education working as an electricians apprentice, before enlisting in the US Navy in 1904.

Barlow's career as an inventor began with his participation in the Mexican Revolution. While working for the Villista forces led by General Pancho Villa, he developed one of the earliest examples of aerial bombs. His work would continue when he became employed by The Martin Company, during which he would develop the "Glmite" bomb.

Barlow was also involved with politics, authoring What Would Lincoln Do—which laid out plans for an economic and political rejuvenation of the United States—As well as leading the short-lived "Modern Seventy-Sixers" group.

== Early life ==
Lester Pence Barlow was born on 2 December 1886, in Monticello, Wisconsin. He was the son of George Barlow and Jessie Peiree Barlow. While still a boy, the family moved near to Clear Lake, Wisconsin. At 14 years old, he left education and became an electricians apprentice in Mason City, Iowa.

== Career ==
=== Naval enlistment and radio engineering ===
Barlow applied to enlist in the United States Navy as a marine engineer, but was refused for being too young. Barlow applied a second time and was accepted into the Navy in 1904 after claiming to be 22 years old—in reality he was 18 at the time. His first posting was working as a fireman aboard the USS Solace, one of the first U.S. naval vessels to have a radio. While stationed in Guam, he supervised the installation of its first radio station, and later supervised the first radio aboard an Imperial Japanese Navy ship. Barlow completed his enlistment in 1908.

=== Mexican revolution and early inventor career ===
In 1914, Barlow joined the insurgent Villista forces led by General Pancho Villa in the Mexican Revolution.

Tinkering with explosives. Barlow persuaded Pancho Villa to purchase an aeroplane, and worked developing one of the earliest examples of aerial bombs. Barlow had previously met with aviation pioneer Glenn L. Martin while in California, and the idea of using an airplane as an offensive weapon had intrigued him. Barlow's early designs were made from melted down old locomotive wheels. The bombs, dropped on trains carrying on Mexican Federal troops, were small and weak, but launched his career as an inventor.

Barlow would go on to develop premature firing bombs, incendiary bombs, fragmentary bombs, and depth bombs.

=== Inventor career and political development ===
In 1931, wrote What Would Lincoln Do, wherein he outlined a series of policies to politically and economically rejuvenate the United States. A substantial amount of the book advocated for an works program to construct a national four-lane transcontinental highway to stimulate growth, 25 years before the establishment of the Interstate Highway System in 1956. At this time, Barlow was the leader of the short-lived Modern Seventy-Sixers group. Barlow would go on to claim that Senator Huey Long borrowed his policies for Long's own Share Our Wealth program.

Barlow called for the resignation of three members of the US Cabinet, and petitioned for the impeachment of US president Franklin Roosevelt.

Lester Barlow brought a suit against the United States for infringement on six of his patents. In 1936, the US Court of Claims found that five of Barlow's six patent claims were valid and declared the United States owed him $500,000 (equivalent to $11,600,000 in 2025). It was only after a court battle that in late 1940, Barlow received payment of $592,719.12 from Congress (equivalent to $13,620,000 in 2025).

In 1938, Barlow began working at the Martin Company. Barlow was stationed in a shed outside the Martin Company's factory, as the company's owner—Glenn L. Martin—feared that Barlow might accidentally blow up the complex.

While working at the Martin Company, Barlow created "Glmite"—an explosive made out of liquid oxygen-carbon and named after G. L. Martin—which saw a series of prominent tests. One demonstration in March 1940 involved Barlow setting fire to, firing a bullet at, and throwing a Glmite bomb towards the crowd of reporters, congressmen and military officials to successfully demonstrate the bomb's safety. Barlow also detonated an 8-ounce (230-gram) charge which shattered a telephone pole and threw chunks of it up to 150 feet (46 metres), as well as a 5-pound (2.3-kilogram) charge which caused a shockwave which reportedly could be felt from 1,000 feet (300 metres).

At least one planned test was to involve the detonation a much larger glmite explosion, with goats at varying intervals away from the charge to see if any would survive. In response to this, Herbert W. Elmore, president of the Washington branch of the American Society for the Prevention of Cruelty to Animals, called for a campaign of protests against glmiting goats or any other animals.

In 1916, Barlow predicted the aerial bombing of cities, and said that the increasing destructiveness of bombs might bring about peace. However he recognized by 1940 that this failed to happen.

== Personal life ==
Lester Barlow married three times. He was first married to Ruby Maryon, daughter of James Henry Maryon, and divorced in 1918. His second marriage was to Gertrude Fitzgerald, who he divorced in 1941. His final marriage was to Eden Rawlins, and ended in a divorce in the mid 1940s.

Barlow died on 6 September 1967, at Stamford Hospital, Connecticut. He was survived by his brother, Floyd Barlow, and Lester Barlow's son—who he fathered with Gertrude Fiszgerald.

== Publications ==
- Barlow, Lester P. (1931). What Would Lincoln Do: A Call for Political Revolution Through the Ballot. Non-partisan League Publishing Company. LCCN 31029806.
