= Battle of Ciudad Juárez (1913) =

Battle of the Mexican Revolution

Second Battle of Ciudad Juárez
- Part of the Mexican Revolution
Date	15 November 1913
Location	Ciudad Juárez, Chihuahua (state), Mexico
Result	Decisive rebel victory

Belligerents
Constitutionalists: División del Norte	Government: Federal Army

Commanders and leaders
Pancho Villa; Victoriano de Anda; Venustiano Carranza; Maclovio Herrera; José Rodríguez; Enrique Santos Coy	Francisco Castro; Salvador Mercado; Victoriano Huerta

Strength
2,000	Around 600

Casualties and losses
Light	Major

The Second Battle of Ciudad Juárez, also known as the Capture of Ciudad Juárez or “Villa’s Trojan Train”, was a decisive rebel victory over the forces of Mexican president Victoriano Huerta. The federal garrison of the border city of Juárez was tricked into allowing 2,000 revolutionaries to enter the city on board a hijacked coal train. The revolutionaries crept out of the train under the cover of darkness and easily overcame the federal forces with a surprise attack.

Upon successfully capturing the city of Torreón in late September 1913, Pancho Villa had moved quickly to seize the state capital of Chihuahua, Ciudad Chihuahua. His effort to take the city was abandoned after three days of frontal assaults failed to break the federal forces. While pulling back from the city Villa's troops captured a coal train at the station of El Sauz. After removing the cargo, Villa's men telegraphed the railway headquarters in the city of Juárez stating that the tracks had been blown up and requesting further orders. Once headquarters replied that the train must return to Juárez, 2,000 men led by Villa hid aboard the now empty cargo cars and entered the city without detection around 2:00 am on November 15. Fighting began at 2:10 am and lasted until roughly 5:00 am when the majority of federal forces surrendered.

The capture of Juárez provided a massive boost to Villa's international fame, being praised by the American press for his ingenuity and the discipline of his men. Domestically, the battle helped to restore the Division del Norte's morale and faith in the leadership of Villa, both of which had been strained by the disastrous assault on Ciudad Chihuahua. Besides bolstering morale, control of the cities’ location on the American border and large number of taxable casinos provided Villa with both a steady source of income and would eventually allow for a direct supply line through which arms could be purchased from the Americans following the end of the American arms embargo to Mexico in early 1914. Finally, the capture of the city forced the federal garrison of Ciudad Chihuahua to take to the field in an effort to reverse Villa's gains. This relief force was decisively defeated by Villa at the climactic Battle of Tierra Blanca, which secured rebel domination over the state of Chihuahua.

== Background ==
In February 1913, President Francisco Madero of Mexico was assassinated after resigning power to a military coup d’état led by general Victoriano Huerta. Huerta quickly moved to secure his power, assassinating the governor of Chihuahua, Abraham González, and imprisoning or exiling many other governors who suspected were loyal to the former revolutionary government. In response to these actions the states of Sonora and Coahuila raised militias in revolt, and rebel bands began to appear across the country.

One former revolutionary general, Pancho Villa, had been living in the United States having escaped from federal military prison in November 1912. When Villa heard that his two idols and close friends, Madero and Gonzalez, had been killed by Heurta he crossed the border into Mexico and declared himself in revolt. Quickly gaining followers and power in Northwestern Chihuahua, Villa accepted an offer to recognize the governor of Coahuila, Venustiano Carranza, as the leader of the revolution.

By July 1913, the federal government had retaken much of Coahuila after defeating Carranza's troops in open combat three times, at the battles of Anhelo, Saltillo, and Monclova. With the Northeast of Mexico mostly stabilized, the federal forces began an offensive against the decentralized rebel bands of Chihuahua. Led by Pascual Orozco, this offensive tore through the rebel bands of southern Chihuahua and quickly occupied the state capital, Chihuahua city. This dynamic change shattered the confidence of the rebel bands, who realized they could no longer successfully resist federal forces separately. The leaders of the main rebel bands in the states of Chihuahua and Durango met on September 26, 1913, and elected Villa as the leader of a united rebel force called the Division del Norte.

The newly formed Division del Norte moved to occupy the City of Torreón, a wealthy railway hub in Coahuila, with the hope it would provide supplies, income, and limit federal railway activity in the northeast. Due to the ineptitude of the federal commanders in the region and the excellent discipline and morale of the rebel troops, Torreón fell quickly to a series of day and night attacks.

The victory at the battle of Torreón provided the Division del Norte with a large volume of arms and ammunition and enabled the formation of a substantial artillery company. The Division quickly moved to secure domination of the state of Chihuahua by taking the capital: Ciudad Chihuahua. Unfortunately, Villa's success with frontal attacks at Torreón resulted in him attempting the same strategy against the garrison of the city. Unlike Torreón, the federal garrison of Chihuahua was supported by a veteran unit of Orozquistas, and was commanded by a competent general, Salvador Mercado. Villa's forces tried to storm the city through frontal assault for three days but gained no ground and lost significant quantities of men and ammunition against the staunch federal defensive line. Finally, on the evening of November 12 Villa ordered a retreat from the city.

== The capture of Juárez ==
=== Rebel strategy ===
The failure of the Division del Norte's attempt to take Ciudad Chihuahua placed Villa in a tough spot. The attempt had wasted a significant portion of the Division's ammunition, and had shaken the trust in Villa's leadership that was binding the former rebel bands of Chihuahua and Durango into a unified fighting force. Villa needed a quick victory under his belt, but it now appeared to federal commanders and international observers that he had nowhere to go. The two main options available to Villa's forces were to retreat southward towards the safety of the cities of Hidalgo del Parral and Torreón, from where more attacks could be launched against federal forces in the centre of the republic, or he could strike north to take the City of Juárez, a crucial city on the American border from which they could access to additional income and American arms. However, both options were made risky by the existence of the powerful federal garrison in Chihuahua, which could be mobilized to relieve or recapture any siege initiated by the Division del Norte.

With this situation in mind, Villa decided to split his forces. A group under General Manuel Chao was ordered to retreat south with the trains, artillery, and infantry, blowing train whistles and cutting telegraph lines along the way to throw off the federal troops. Meanwhile, Villa would strike north with his cavalry to launch a surprise attack on the garrison of Ciudad Juárez.

=== Capture of the train ===
On the evening of November 13 Villa's horsemen passed the railway station of El Sauz ~60 kilometres north of Ciudad Chihuahua. A coaling train was arriving at the station at this time, which was ambushed by the Villistas and captured in the station. Following the capture of the train, Villa ordered the destruction of the rail lines leading towards Ciudad Chihuahua and the coal unloaded from the train. Meanwhile, the station's telegraphist was forced at gunpoint to message Juárez reporting that the tracks had been destroyed, likely by rebels, and that the train was awaiting further instruction. In response to the request for instruction, the dispatcher in Juárez demanded that the train return to Ciudad Juárez immediately, making sure to report its safe arrival at each station through further telegraphs. Following the instructions provided, the Villistas travelled north towards Juárez on board the hijacked train, with four of Villa's men disembarking at each station to force the local telegraphist to send a message to Juárez reporting the safe arrival of the train. After the telegraph was sent, villa's men would cut the telegraph lines at the station.

=== The federal garrison ===
The federal garrison of Juárez consisted of about 600 men under the command of Francisco Castro. The garrison's morale was strong, as Ciudad Juárez was considered exceptionally well defended, both by its significant physical fortifications, and its location across the Rio Grande from the US city of El Paso. Any stray shots fired by a rebel attack on the city could cause casualties in the US city, providing a significant chance of intervention by the US army against rebel assault. This confidence, when combined with news of Villa's presence near Ciudad Chihuahua meant that many of the federal troops were fully invested in the countless bars, brothels and gambling joints of Juárez when the rebel train rolled into the city.

=== Capture of the city ===
The train fully loaded with Villistas arrived at Ciudad Juárez around 2:00 am on November 15, 1913. The rebels disembarked in the centre of Juárez and fanned out to occupy key locations before they were detected. Federal troops noticed the Villista presence at 2:10 am, after which running gunfights began throughout the city. Rebel forces quickly overran much of the city, with the federal barracks, and border tollbooth falling by 4:00 am, and most of the remaining scattered federals laying their arms down by 5:00 am. When the sun rose, only one small group of federals still held out in a house near the Juárez horse racetrack. Eventually this group was forced to surrender after their ammunition ran dry.

== Aftermath ==
Unlike 1911, the capture of Juárez did not secure rebel control over the state of Chihuahua. The federal force in Ciudad Chihuahua still rivalled Villa's Division del Norte in size and equipment and were in high spirits thanks to their successful defence of the state capital. This force's prior success had federal authorities convinced that a reverse of the situation was possible, and a strong expedition was sent north to retake Ciudad Juárez under the command of General Refugio Velesco.

While the capture of Juárez was not the conclusive battle of the Chihuahua campaign, it did immensely improve the strategic position of the Villistas. Along with the obvious gain in ammunition and arms captured from the federal troops, the victory provided an important boost to the morale of the Division del Norte and helped to repair their faith in Villa after the failed attack on Ciudad Chihuahua. Additionally, the victory altered the strategic situation of Chihuahua as Villa's men were no longer pinned between the garrisons of Ciudad Chihuahua and Juárez, and with the federal army approaching by rail from the south had the opportunity to choose the location of the next battle. The obvious site for this battle would have been to utilize the fortifications of Juárez that had fallen mostly intact into rebel hands. However, despite ammunition and arms gained from federal forces at Juárez, the Division del Norte still lacked the necessary ammunition and heavy weapons to hold out in a long siege, possessing only 2 cannons and a small number of machine guns. Thus, Villa decided to seek a decisive engagement with the federals at the small railway station of Tierra Blanca, ~30 km south of Juárez. The battle at Tierra Blanca ultimately provided Villa with his immediate victory and would be the conclusive engagement that forced federal forces back to a single holding in the east of Chihuahua: the border city of Ojinaga.
