= Tomás Urbina =

Mexican revolutionary general

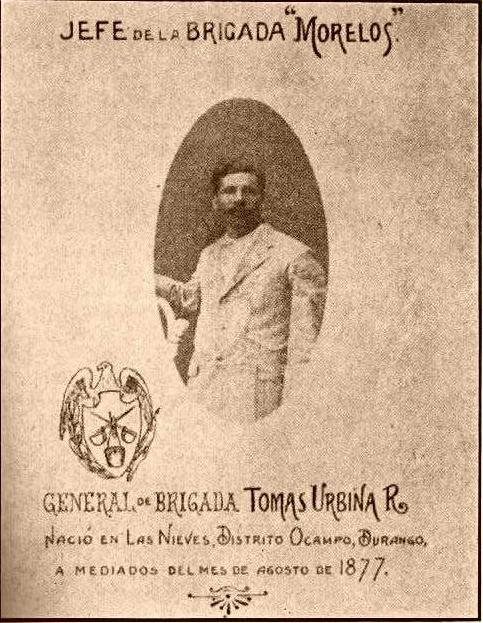
- Born: Tomás Urbina Reyes; 1877; Congregación de Nieves, Ocampo Municipality, Durango
- Died: September 15, 1915 (aged 37–38); Congregación de Nieves, Ocampo Municipality, Durango
- Military career
- Service years: 1910-1915
- Rank: General
- Unit: División del Norte
- Conflicts: Battle of Tlahualilo; Storming of Durango; Battle of Mapimí; Battle of El Ébano

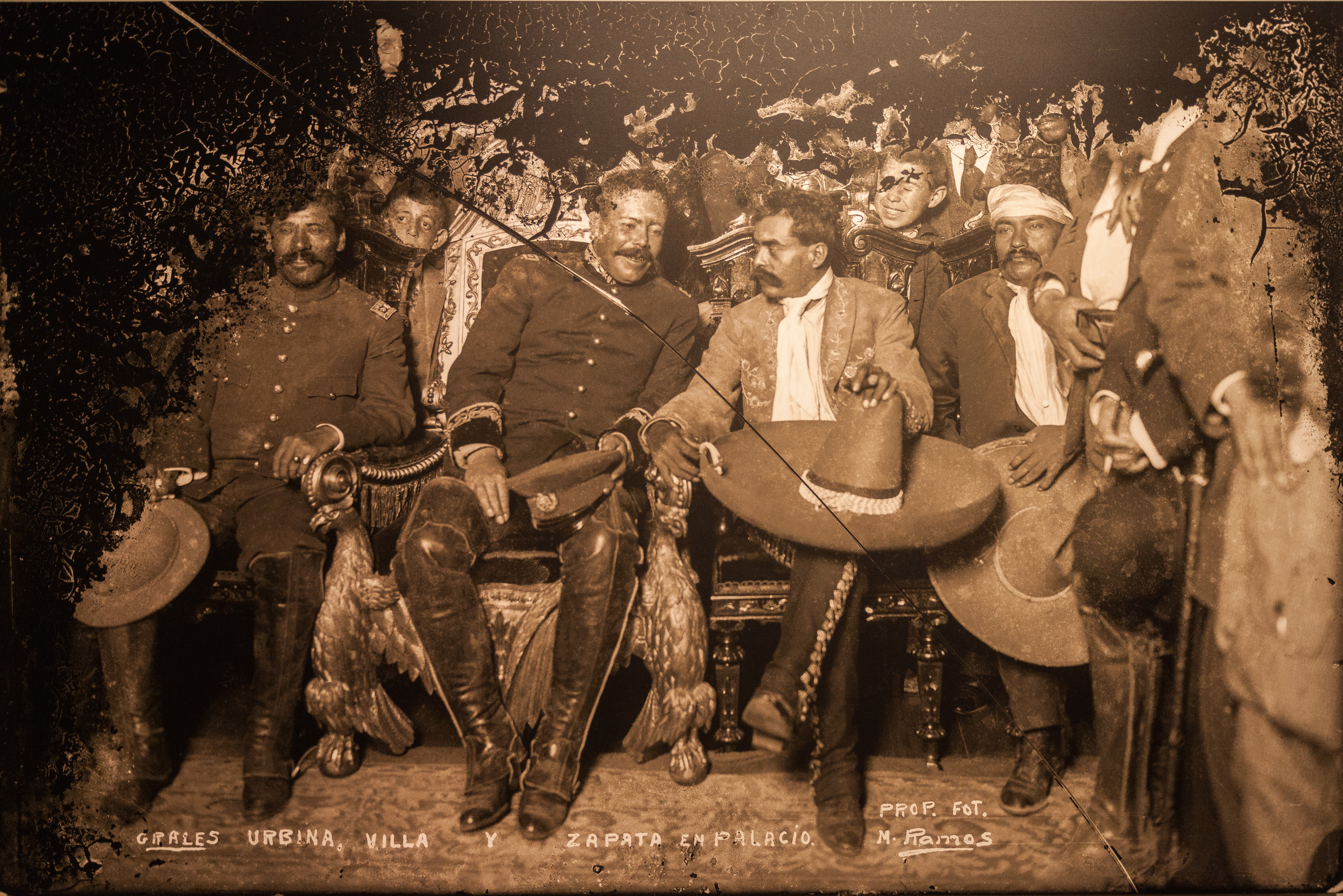
Tomás Urbina (left) next to Pancho Villa and Emiliano Zapata

Tomás Urbina Reyes (c. 1877–1915) was a general during the Mexican Revolution who allied with Pancho Villa and Emiliano Zapata.

Lieutenant Tomas Urbina and his counterpart and fellow General Rodolfo Fierro, have been cited as the two halves of Pancho Villa, Fierro representing his more violent side.

Urbina was executed by General Fierro under the accusation that he betrayed Pancho Villa during the Battle of El Ébano (Spanish: Batalla de El Ébano), a 72-day siege of the town of El Ébano in the state of San Luis Potosí, where Urbina finally surrendered his forces to the Constitutionalist faction, and allegedly received a sum of money for his surrender.

== In film ==
In the film Villa Rides (1968), Urbina was portrayed by Robert Viharo.

In Reed: Insurgent Mexico (1973), Urbina was portrayed by Eduard López Rojas.

== In literature ==
Urbina is a major character in the novel, The Friends of Pancho Villa (1996), by James Carlos Blake.
