= Battle of Celaya =

1915 battle of the Mexican Revolution

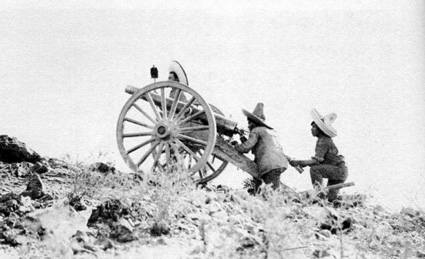
- Battle of Celaya in Guanajuato
Date	6–15 April 1915
Location	Celaya, Guanajuato, Mexico
Result	Constitutionalist victory

Belligerents
Constitutionalists: Constitutional Army	Conventionists: División del Norte

Commanders and leaders
Álvaro Obregón	Pancho Villa

Strength
15,000; 13 big field guns	22,000

Casualties and losses
695 killed 641 wounded	6,000 killed 6,500 captured 5,000 wounded

The Battle of Celaya, 6–15 April 1915, was part of a series of military engagements in the Bajío during the Mexican Revolution between the winners, who had allied against the regime of Gen. Victoriano Huerta (February 1913-July 1914) and then fought each other for control of Mexico. The Constitutionalists under Gen. Venustiano Carranza faced off against the Army of the División del Norte of Pancho Villa. The first battle of Celaya was fought April 6–7, 1915, near Celaya in present-day Guanajuato, Mexico. The second battle of Celaya was fought April 15–16. These encounters between the Constitutionalist Army led by Gen. Álvaro Obregón, Venustiano Carranza's best general, and the army under the command of Pancho Villa were crucial in determining the outcome of the Mexican Revolution.

Obregón chose the site of battle, arrived in advance to prepare it and kept to his defensive strategy, knowing Villa's propensity for blind cavalry charges over an open field. Villa's defeat was the result of his multiple tactical miscalculations and overconfidence in his much larger, undefeated army's ability to best Obregón's army under any circumstances. Villa's División del Norte outnumbered Obregón's Constitutionalists 2:1, but Obregón had lured Villa far from his communication and supply lines to a field with existing canals and trenches. Obregón was able to utilize many tactical innovations from the Western Front in the First World War—namely trenches, barbed wire and machine guns—in the defense. Villa continued his use of massed cavalry charges. New logistical and troop movement techniques such as the use of trains were seen.

Obregón and Villa met twice more in the Bajío at León (also called the battle of Trinidad), in a protracted battle lasting 38 days, and at Aguascalientes in July, sealing the Constitutionalists' victory over Villa. Taken together these battles in the Bajío are considered a watershed event in the Mexican Revolution and helped determine the military course of it. "The two battles of Celaya did not bring the warring to an end, but they foretold Villa's ultimate defeat." Villa lost as many as 50,000 men in these Bajío battles, and he ceased to be a force to contend with on a national scale.

== Commanders and armies ==
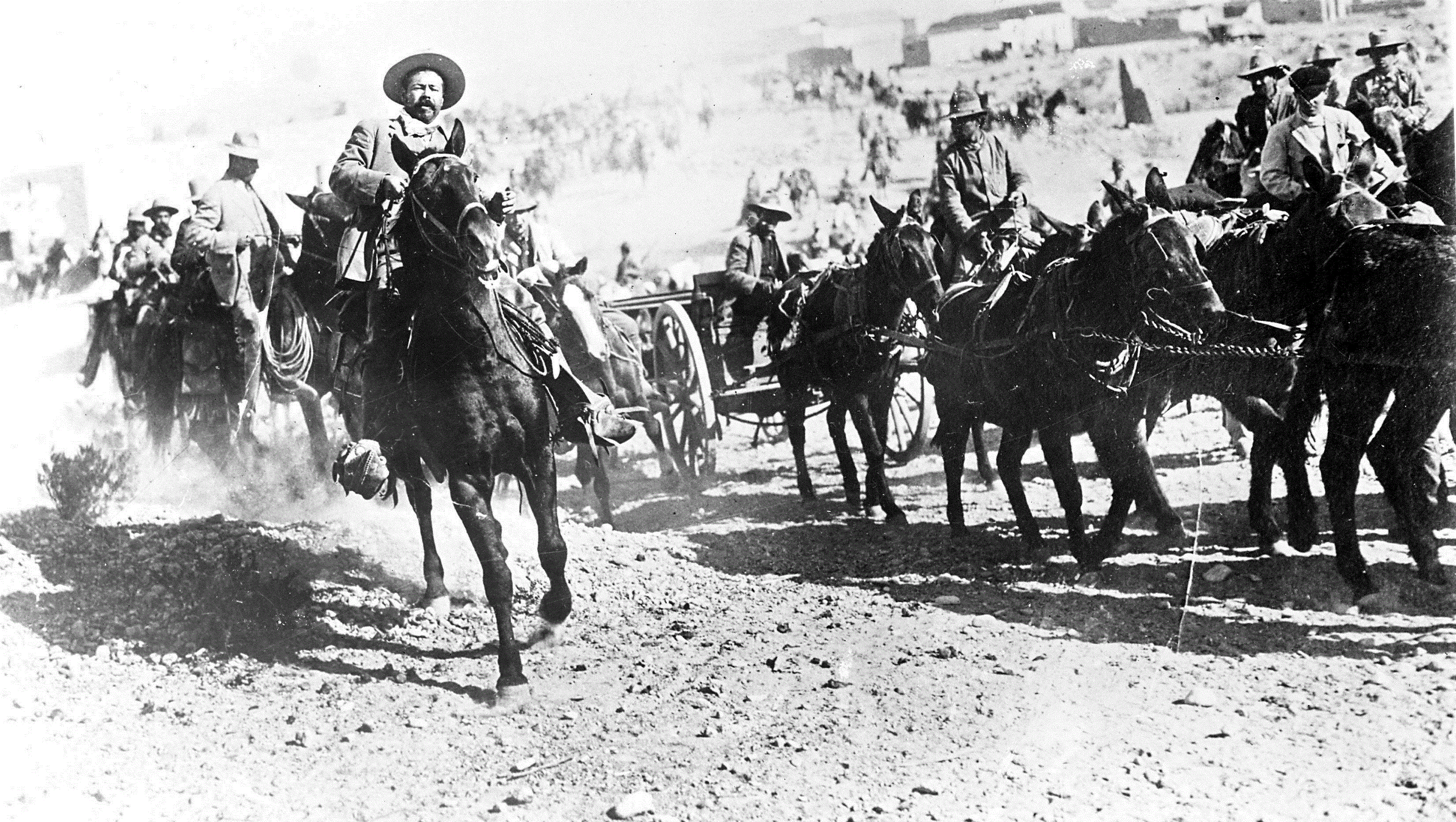
Gen. Pancho Villa, previously general of the División del Norte before the Battle of Celaya

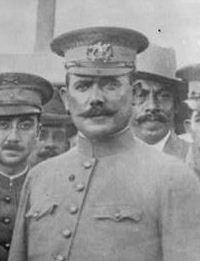
Constitutionalist Army Gen. Álvaro Obregón, whose victory over Pancho Villa propelled him to national prominence. He became president of Mexico in 1920.

The commander of the Constitutionalist forces was Álvaro Obregón. He, like Villa, had no formal military education but had served in a professional army. His military career began when he belatedly joined pro-Madero forces in 1912 to put down the anti-Madero rebellion of Pascual Orozco, but to his regret he had not joined Madero's original call for revolution in 1910.

His military service was quite distinguished and he initially left the army as a colonel. He deftly navigated the shifting political alliances that marked the early days of the Mexican Revolution. Eventually he was appointed to be the senior general in the Carranza administration. Obregón often enlisted the help of military advisers and was an avid student of the latest military technological and tactical advancements. One of his most respected advisers was Col. Maximilian Kloss, a German immigrant turned army officer. Kloss' military advice and remarkable insight into the nature of Villa's style of war would prove decisive at Celaya. Obregón himself was known to be an urbane, intellectual person.

Villa, by contrast, was nearly illiterate and had never served in a professional army. However, he complemented his staff with Gen. Felipe Angeles, a capable career officer. After defecting to Villa's División del Norte from Venustiano Carranza's Constitutionalist Army in March 1914, Angeles became one of Villa's most trusted military advisers. Unlike Villa, Angeles was more careful and calculating. Privately, he thought that Villa was often too rash in his decision-making. Angeles' initial absence due to an injury while riding his horse would prove critical at the beginning of the Battle of Celaya.

The army of Pancho Villa, the División del Norte, which had fought alongside the Constitutionalist Army (1913–14) to oust Victoriano Huerta, was not an army in the modern, industrialized sense. In addition to their military component, Villa's army also included a large component of camp followers or soldaderas, who followed behind the main military force. These camp followers were often refugees, soldiers' wives and family, and support personnel. This often slowed down Villa's military forces and he eventually banned them. Villa himself was an excellent horseman from his early days as a bandit and tended to favor his cavalry and rely upon its speed to quickly maneuver around an enemy force. Before the Battle of Celaya, Villa's forces had never been defeated in a major battle against its opponents.

Obregón was a skilled military commander and understood that if Villa could be lured into a decisive battle, his forces could be completely destroyed. Villa had consulted with his chief military adviser, Felipe Angeles, who attempted to convince him to avoid a major set-piece battle. History would vindicate Angeles' military expertise, as Villa's forces and tactics were no match for Obregón's use of modern weaponry and tactics. Reportedly, Villa's rationale for insisting on engaging Obregón's forces was that he did not want to appear weak or inhibit the fighting spirit of his men. However, his actual words to Gen. Angeles cannot be completely verified, as no actual record of their conversation exists. Obregón's men made excellent use of barbed wire and field-expedient obstacles to slow, disrupt and maneuver Villa's forces into the fields of fire prepared for them. As a fighting force, the cavalry and infantry elements of the Villistas were highly mobile in early 20th-century terms. Villa used the rail system to maneuver his troops quickly, just as the Rurales, the crack rural police force of Porfirio Díaz, were deployed before the Revolution.

== Prelude ==
Villa was known to be a rash and sometimes overconfident commander who would not refuse a battle with Obregón's forces. This weakness would prove to be his undoing at Celaya. Also, Villa and Obregón intensely disliked each other, which led to a war of words before the battle. Publicly, Villa referred to Obregón as "El Perfumado" or "the one who wears perfume", referring to Obregón's perceived more refined qualities. While Villa was often impulsive and inflammatory, he was sometimes shrewd and cunning. Obregón understood Villa's character and often tried to infuriate and provoke him. Immediately before the Battle of Celaya, Obregón boasted of his eventual defeat of Villa and even offered to dedicate his inevitable victory to his friends. As the war of words between the two commanders became more heated, Villa gave the following statement to the newspaper Vida Nueva on the night before the battle began: "This time Obregón will not escape me. I know that he will attempt to withdraw as he always does, but I shall force him to fight in order to destroy the forces that constitute an obstacle to military operations without being of any great use to the enemy." As both sides sought a decisive battle, the stage was set for a huge military engagement. Obregón lured Villa to the field of battle that Obregón had chosen in the Bajio. Villa's fighting style was traditional warfare relying on frontal attacks and cavalry charges. Obregón, however, adopted advanced tactics in the form of trenches and barbed wire, which were being used in the First World War.

== First battle ==
=== Strategic preparation ===
Obregón's strategy was to draw Villa's army away from its lines of communication and supply and choose the place for a major encounter. Obregón's lines of communication and supply were much shorter than Villa's, but they were stretched nonetheless, as Obregón moved north, closer to Villa's territory. Emiliano Zapata's followers might have cut Obregón's supply lines near Veracruz, but did not, "to Villa's disgust." Before the Battle of Celaya began, Obregón's forces occupied the field first, a strategic advantage. This was critical to the primarily defensive strategy of Obregón. In a broad stroke he planned to goad Villa into an all-out frontal assault on his well-prepared defensive positions. As students of modern warfare, Obregón and his military advisers were acutely aware that machine guns, barbed wired and dug-in artillery gave a marked advantage to a defender. The terrain at Celaya was excellent for a defending force with modern armaments.

Obregón's advance forces arrived at Celaya in early March, nearly a month before the battle itself. By early April he had increased the size of his forces, with "6,000 cavalry, 5,000 infantry, 86 machine guns and 13 field pieces." It is unclear how many Villa commanded at Celaya.

While Villa planned to use his artillery assets to weaken Obregón's defensive position, his overall plan was simply a full frontal assault by his cavalry and infantry at dawn on April 6, 1915. Prior to the battle, Villa had not personally surveyed the battlefield and was confident that his forces would punch through any defenses or his cavalry could outmaneuver them. The Constitutionalists had prepared cleared, overlapping fields of fire for their machine guns. Additionally, there were many ditches and small irrigation canals that, when improved, would serve as trenches to provide excellent cover and concealment to Obregón's forces.

Critically, both Villa's División del Norte and Obregón's forces suffered chronic shortages of munitions. This was due in large part to the demand for ammunition created by the First World War and also to the increasing cost of the ammunition that remained for sale. This lack of ammunition resupply would prove to be a pivotal issue in the Battle of Celaya. Allegedly, some of the ammunition that Villa had purchased before the battle from private vendors from the US was faulty and failed to perform under the conditions of the battle. Whether or not this was deceit on the part of the suppliers is difficult if not impossible to discern. Furthermore, Villa's forces were at a marked disadvantage regarding their artillery. Not only did Obregon's forces possess 15 more artillery pieces than Villa, their scarce European-sourced ammunition was vastly more lethal, reliable and had a further effective range. Before the battle began, Villa was well aware of his force's shortage of ammunition and communicated this in a message to Emiliano Zapata. Additionally, Villa's forces did not attempt to disrupt the resupply of Obregón's forces from the port city of Veracruz.

=== Battle ===
After the Constitutionalists occupied the battlefield on April 4, 1915, their commanders knew that the Villistas were close. As Obregón's troops fortified their defensive positions and waited for the Villista main attack, Villa's forces began to move towards Celaya on April 5. In order to disrupt the movement of Villa's forces, Obregón ordered a 1,500-man element to occupy a hacienda called "El Guaje" near Celaya, to serve as a base to attack the railways that Villa relied upon for movement of his troops. This was a tactical miscalculation, as the majority of the Villista forces were already nearby and immediately attacked the comparatively small Constitutionalist force. As soon as Obregón heard of the engagement, he quickly boarded a troop train to personally reinforce his men at the hacienda. A competent military mind, Obregón immediately realized that this initial tactical error could be the perfect ruse to lure the bulk of Villa's forces into his defensive positions. Obregon ordered his forces to retreat; the Villistas took the bait and pursued the Constitutionalists back towards their prepared positions at Celaya.

As Villa's forces attacked the enemy defenses, their advance was halted by Obregon's machine guns and artillery. Instead of using his cavalry to outmaneuver the enemy defenses, Villa ordered his troops to launch wave after wave of frontal assaults against Obregón's positions. After the battle, Obregón recalled that the Villistas launched nearly 40 assaults with only a single penetration of his own lines. Even this minor success was thwarted by a quick-thinking Obregón. As the Villistas occupied the defensive positions they had captured, Obregón ordered his bugler to sound general retreat. The Villistas, believing the order to have come from their own bugler, were fooled into retreating and surrendered the only ground they had gained during the fighting. As Villa's men retreated, Obregón seized the opportunity and ordered a devastating counterattack.

In addition to his battle-weary forces, Obregón also called in his reserve, which pushed the Villistas back to their own lines. In a stroke of good fortune for Obregón, the Villistas' supply of ammunition for their small arms had run low after the day's fighting. In the middle of the retreat, one of Villa's commanders defected to the Constitutionalists and opened fire on Villa's troops. By a series of good tactical decisions and considerable luck, Obregón had won the first battle of Celaya.

=== Aftermath ===
The results of the first battle were not catastrophic or conclusive for either side. Importantly, however, Villa was dealt his first major military setback as a commander. Despite that, morale among the Villistas was still high and they were prepared to re-engage the Constitutionalists. Villa was quick to place the blame for the day's defeat on his lack of ammunition and resupply. This fact, combined with his failure to maintain a reserve force and his playing into the hands of Obregón by engaging on the battleground Obregon had chosen, is a more realistic appraisal of the defeat.

Villa consulted his staff, who understood that they would need to attempt to either outmaneuver Obregón or force him out of his defensive position. According to Friedrich Katz, Villa sent a letter to Obregón asking him to abandon Celaya in the hope that civilian casualties could be avoided. Obregón declined Villa's invitation, clearly understanding Villa's real intention to deceive him into abandoning his advantageous defense position. Villa's appeal proved popular with foreigners in Celaya, who feared the damage the Villista artillery would wreak on the city.

== Second battle ==
=== Preparation ===
Both sides resupplied to their best ability for the ensuing battle they knew would come, as neither side was going to retreat. However, ammunition was running low on both sides of the battlefield. Obregón wisely calculated that Villa would not attempt to bypass his defenses. In preparation, Obregón ordered his men to place much more barbed wire along potential Villista avenues of approach and cover the obstacles with additional machine-gun fire. Understanding the critical impact his reserve force had had earlier, Obregón ordered Gen. Cesareo Castro to lead a nearly 6,000-man cavalry force to conceal themselves in a nearby wooded area. The Villistas did not observe the force being positioned and were to be surprised by a reserve element. In addition to their military advantages, Obregón's men were emboldened by their resounding earlier defeat of the Villista forces. Villa himself was a victim of his earlier successes. He knew that his own prestige and the prestige of his army was at stake and they had to attack Obregón wherever they found him. Despite being low on ammunition, with morale dropping and at a tactical disadvantage, Villa's forces prepared to attack.

=== Battle ===
The second battle of Celaya began on April 13, 1915, with a massive frontal assault by the Villista cavalry on the Constitutionalist defensive lines. As in the first battle, the Villista cavalry was repeatedly driven back again and again by the overwhelming machine-gun fire from Obregón's trenches. The Villistas continued this tactic for nearly two days as their cavalry and infantry conducted assault after assault on the trenches, each time meeting defeat. Even after the Villista artillery attempted to weaken the enemy's defenses with artillery barrages, the defenses continued to repulse every Villista attack.

However, all was not well with Obregón's forces. After days of fighting and limited resupply, their ammunition supply was running dangerously low. So precarious was their logistical situation that Obregón wrote an urgent telegram to President Carranza on the second day of fighting on April 14, 1915: "I have the honor of telling you that the fighting has become desperate. We have no reserves of ammunition and we only have sufficient bullets to fight for a few hours more. We will undertake every effort to save the situation." After receiving the message, Carranza immediately dispatched a train loaded with munitions to Obregón at Celaya. This resupply was critical to continue the fight against Villa's massive numbers of soldiers. As Villa's troops were exhausted after nearly 48 hours of combat, Obregón sprang his reserve cavalry force from the north and counterattacked as he had done in the previous battle. With a larger, more mobile reserve force, the attack was completely devastating to the Villistas and a full retreat ensued. Obregón sealed his victory at Celaya by ordering his forces to completely drive the Villistas from the field.

=== Aftermath ===
While Villa and his senior staff had escaped, Obregón had won a nearly total victory for the Constitutionalists. Many of the Villista junior officers were not as fortunate as their senior commanders and were captured or surrendered to Obregón's forces. Obregón ordered all of the 120 officers his men had captured to be executed. In addition to capturing many of the Villistas' experienced officers, the Constitutionalists also captured thousands of small arms and ammunition, hundreds of horses and dozens of almost irreplaceable artillery pieces.

== Subsequent events ==
Following the battle at Celaya, Obregón sent a telegram to President Carranza saying, "Fortunately, Villa led the attack personally" explaining his victory against Villa. Estimates of casualties on both sides vary widely, as Villa attempted to soften the blow of his defeat after the battle. The Battle of Celaya is referred to by some historians of the period as Pancho Villa's "Waterloo" in the sense that he was dealt a crippling military defeat. Irreparable damage was done to both his military power and his critical aura of invincibility. Further, a number of domestic and foreign observers of the revolution came to the conclusion that the Villistas were not capable of defeating the Constitutionalist army.

Militarily, the Villistas were never again as strong as they were before taking the field at Celaya in April 1915. As a result of the disastrous battle, Villa himself was forced to go on the defensive in an attempt to reorganize his forces and procure war materiel lost at Celaya. His faithful adviser Gen. Felipe Angeles argued that Villa should return to northern Mexico, where he had allies and could reconstruct the División del Norte.

Villa, displaying supreme confidence in his military judgement, decided to conduct a defensive battle at León similar to what Obregón had done at Celaya. Obregón himself continued his to pursue his destruction of Villa in the ensuing battles of the revolution. At the battle of León, Obregón lost his right arm in the fighting and nearly died.

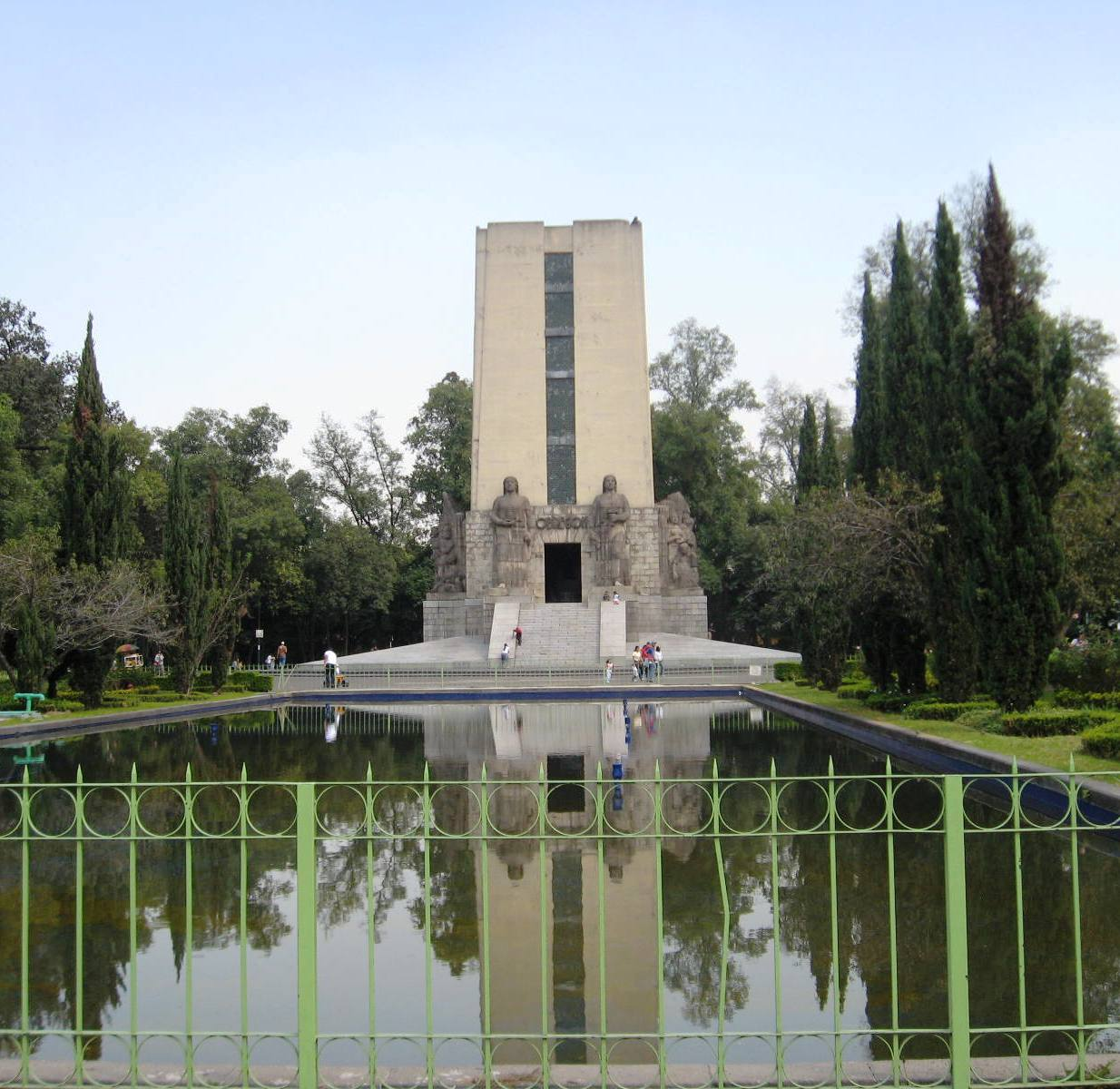
Monument to Álvaro Obregón in the Parque de la Bombilla, Mexico City.

The location of the battle of Celaya is in the immediate vicinity of the present-day city of Celaya, Guanajuato, Mexico. The site of the battlefield is currently not commemorated by any official major monument or museum. In Mexico City there is a monument to Obregón on the site where he was assassinated in 1928; until 1986, the monument contained Obregón's arm, which he lost at León, preserved in formaldehyde.

The battle of Celaya would prove to be Villa's last major contribution in the civil war as he was no longer a powerful leader. Thus, the United States began to shift their support to the victorious constitutionalists and forcing Villa to go on the run.
