= Julio Cárdenas =

Julio Cárdenas (unknown – May 14, 1916) was a captain in Pancho Villa's Villista military organization. He was second-in-command to Villa and the head of his personal bodyguard. The Battle of Columbus, New Mexico, in which 18 Americans were killed, sparked the campaign, led by General John J. Pershing, to eradicate Villa's organization.

One of Pershing's aides-de-camp was Lt. George S. Patton, who had been searching haciendas of known Villa leaders while on a foraging expedition to obtain corn for horses. Cárdenas and two other men (a private and a captain in the Villa force) were found during a carefully planned search of the San Miguelito Ranch, after Patton arrived in three cars with ten additional American troopers and two civilian guides. Cárdenas and his two men fled on horseback, were cut off, and then opened fire on the Americans, resulting in a small firefight between the two groups. In the skirmish, Lt. Patton was popularly said to have personally shot Cárdenas with his six-gun. Patton then put a notch in his gun and strapped Cárdenas to the hood of his car (along with two other dead villistas). He later took Cárdenas's spurs as a souvenir. These spurs are now in the Museum of World War II.

However, in the actual fighting, Patton only reported shooting the horse of one of two other men at close range, allowing that man to be killed shortly thereafter. All of the three men who were killed in the fight were shot at by Patton at some point. However, in the end, all the bodies had multiple wounds and with four or five men in the American force firing at the same time, it was impossible to attribute these kills individually to any one trooper. Cárdenas was killed last, by that time fleeing on foot. According to Patton's account, one of the two civilian guides, an ex-Villista named E.L. Holmdahl (now working for the Americans) actually fired the last shot that killed the wounded Cárdenas, who at the end of the fight had refused to surrender and continued firing.
