= Rodolfo Fierro =

Mexican revolutionary (1885–1915)

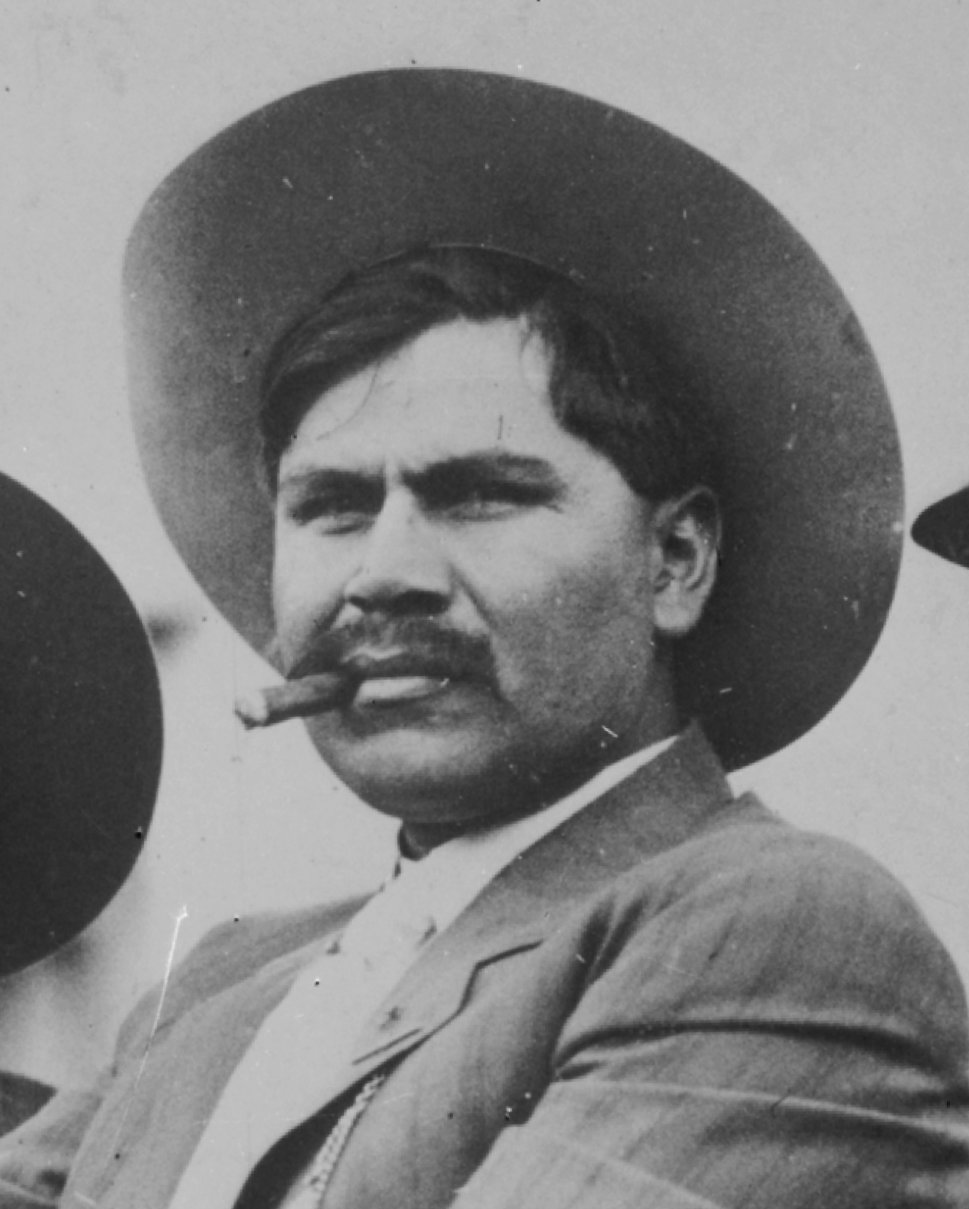
- Born: 1885; Charay, El Fuerte, Sinaloa
- Died: October 14, 1915 (aged 29–30); Nuevo Casas Grande, Chihuahua
- Military career
- Allegiance: Army of Pancho Villa
- Branch: División del Norte
- Service years: 3 years
- Rank: Brigadier General
- Nickname: El Carnicero
- Units: División del Norte, 1913-1915
- Conflicts: Mexican Revolution: Battle of Tierra Blanca; Battle of Torreón; Battle of San Pedro de las Colonias; Battle of Paredón; Battle of Zacatecas; Battle of León; Battle of Celaya

General Rodolfo Fierro (1885 – 14 October 1915) was a railway worker, railway superintendent, federal soldier and a major general in the army of Pancho Villa during the Mexican Revolution in the Division del Norte. Fierro and his counterpart and fellow lieutenant, Tomas Urbina, have been cited as the two halves of Pancho Villa, Fierro representing his malicious side. It is believed Fierro met Pancho Villa in 1913 following the Madero revolution. Originating from Sinaloa, Fierro was a former federal officer having taken part in fighting against the Yaqui Indians. Following his role as a federal officer, Fierro went on to work as a railway man, eventually being absorbed into Villa's ranks.

== Early life ==
Although his date of birth is unknown, in his death certificate, it is read that he died at the age of 30 in 1915, which would make his birth year 1885. What is certain is that Rodolfo Fierro was born in the village of Charay, municipality of El Fuerte in the state of Sinaloa, being the son of Víctor Félix and Rosa López Castro, a Tehueca woman, who worked as a maid in the house of Gumersindo and Venancia Fierro. The little newborn was abandoned by his biological parents and left in the adoption of the Fierro family. His infancy passed without material deficiencies being one of the seven brothers most pampered by his adoptive family. At school, he excelled in mathematics. Due to his good behavior, years later his father gave him his first horse named Pintó.

As a child Fierro played Benito Juárez and shooting Emperor Maximilian in the Cerro de las Campanas. In addition, he was constantly being told the phrase, "When I am a general." In 1900, his father Don Gumersindo died, and by 1902, he travelled to Cananea, Sonora in search of work. He was fond of cockfighting, playing cards, horse racing, and dancing.

From a very young age, he developed a fondness for whiskey, which he drank in large quantities. Around 1908, he travelled to Hermosillo, Sonora, where he enlisted in the corps of rurales under the command of Luis Medina Barrón. He had come to this corp thanks to the recommendation of Don José María Paredes and where he always stood out for his bravery and intelligence in the assigned conditions.

Due to a visit by Vice President Ramón Corral, a dance was organized at the Government Palace. There Fierro met María de la Luz Dessens Peralta, daughter of Don Pedro Dessens, a wealthy man from Sonora. Don José María Paredes pleaded with Luis Medina Barrón for Fierro to be promoted to lieutenant and thus with a higher military rank he could woo the wealthy Luz. A year later, on October 22, 1906, Fierro and Luz married and Fierro left the rural corps. On August 28, 1907, his daughter María de la Luz Agustín Fierro Decens was born.

His wife Luz died due to health complications on December 18 of that same year. It is said that Fierro cried bitterly. The following year his daughter also fell ill, dying on October 19, 1908. This caused Fierro's madness, always crying bitterly and unusually drinking alcohol.

Later he began to work in the South Pacific railroad as a brakeman and later as a machinist. A curious fact was that on June 4, 1912, when Villa was taken prisoner to Mexico City, it was Fierro himself who would drive said train. They still did not know each other.

== Roles ==
=== Soldier ===
Fierro's prominence is often cited back to the Battle of Tierra Blanca on 23 November 1913. The battle included 5,500 of Villa's soldiers, against an estimated 7,000 federal soldiers. Before the battle began Fierro had been sent South to destroy the railroad tracks, forcing the federal soldiers to halt. As Villa flanked the well armed federal soldiers with cavalry, a locomotive filled with dynamite and percussion caps was rammed into the federal soldiers rail cars, the resulting explosion caused the federal soldiers to flee to nearby undamaged rail cars in retreat. Fierro is then noted as riding on horseback after the escaping locomotive, climbing on to the locomotive, running across the roofs of the rail cars, and shooting dead the boilerman and conductor, pulling the train to a complete stop. All federal soldiers captured were executed and in the battle Villa captured 4 locomotives, 7 machine guns, horses, rifles and 400,000 rounds of small arms ammunition. The death toll during the battle stood around 1,000 federal soldiers killed and 300 of Villa's.

=== Executioner ===
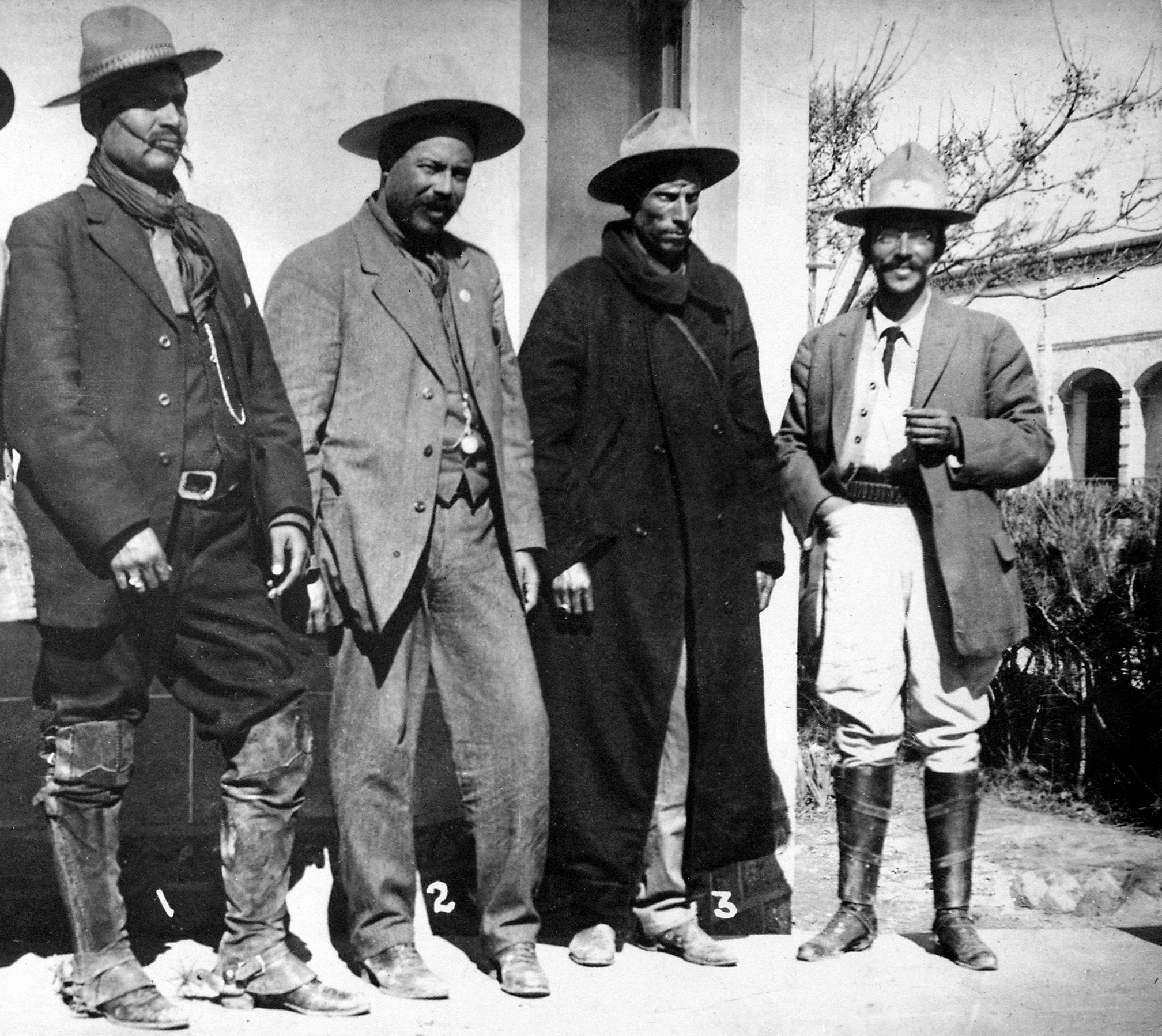
(left to right) General Rodolfo Fierro, Pancho Villa, General Toribio Ortega, Col. Medina

Fierro is most known as Villa's executioner, known as el carnicero (English: the butcher). A 1930 novel El águila y la serpiente by Martín Luis Guzmán gives Fierro his nom de guerre. Guzmán describes events following the capture of over 300 Orozquistas soldiers, followers of Pascual Orozco. The captured soldiers were led into a large field with Fierro on one end, and a wall on the other. They were informed, if they were to reach the opposite end and climb over the wall they would be allowed to continue on free. In groups of ten the captured men were set out to run, Fierro alone firing his pistol at them as they ran, his soldiers handing him fresh pistols to continue firing without delay. One captive is noted as making it over the wall and to freedom, only after Fierro stopped to massage an achy trigger finger. The shooting went on for two hours. Another account recounts that Fierro would ask each prisoner if they would rather return to their family, or join the army of Pancho Villa. Those deciding to return to their family were seen as men who would head back to their old regiment and were executed. Those choosing to join Pancho Villa were provided with a horse, a gun, and three bullets.

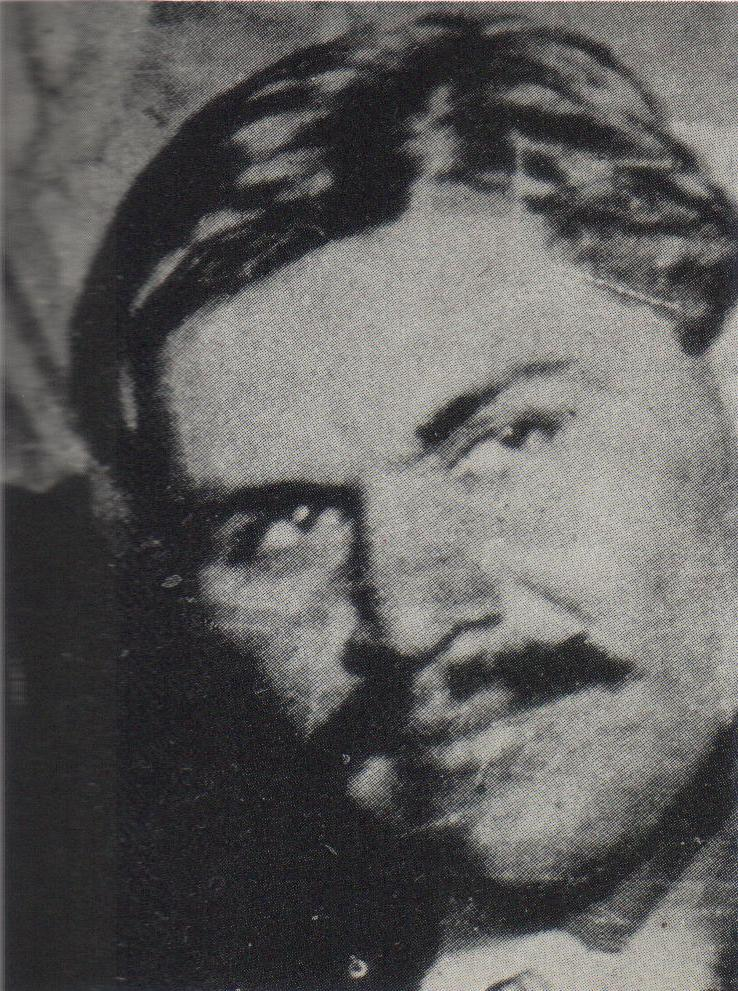
General Rodolfo Fierro in 1914

Other stories exist of Fierro shooting a man dead in public in the state of Chihuahua. The person, sitting across from Fierro, argued that a man shot would fall backwards, Fierro disagreed. To settle the bet Fierro shot the man, and watched as he fell forward, confirming to Fierro that he was correct. A similar story is told by John Reed: outside the theater of Durango, a drunken man asked Fierro what time it was; Fierro said: "You! How dare you speak to me before I speak to you first-" and shot him dead.

While working as Villa's railway superintendent, Fierro was publicly reprimanded by Villa for a train of supply water running 35 minutes late. Fierro, when the train arrived is said to have shot the conductor dead as an act of vengeance for his humiliation. This incident sparked strife amongst the railway workers, who primarily supported Villa. In another incident, a drunken Fierro killed a railway worker for bumping into him, this final incident caused Villa to act. Villa permitted a judge to begin collecting evidence against Fierro into his actions, even as the judge begged to be removed from the case for fear of repercussion. The case never went to trial but Fierro was removed from the position of railway superintendent. It is often stated the case was a sham, simply to continue to retain support from the much needed railway workers.

==== Benton killing ====
Fierro is also known for the murder of William Benton on 17 February 1914, an Englishman and land owner in Mexico who had his land confiscated by Villa's forces. Numerous stories exist around what happened. Benton is cited as having stormed into Villa's headquarters in Ciudad Juárez, demanding his land back from Villa, in which Villa refused. Following his refusal, Villa maintains Benton unsuccessfully attempted to draw a six-shooter pistol, he was wrestled to the floor and given a formal court martial and found guilty of attempted assassination, he was then executed and buried. A conflicting story exists in which Benton drew his pistol but was detained and removed from the town at night. He was taken to the desert, where a hole was dug and Fierro is believed to have struck Benton in the head with a shovel, dumping him into the grave without checking to see if Benton was still alive.

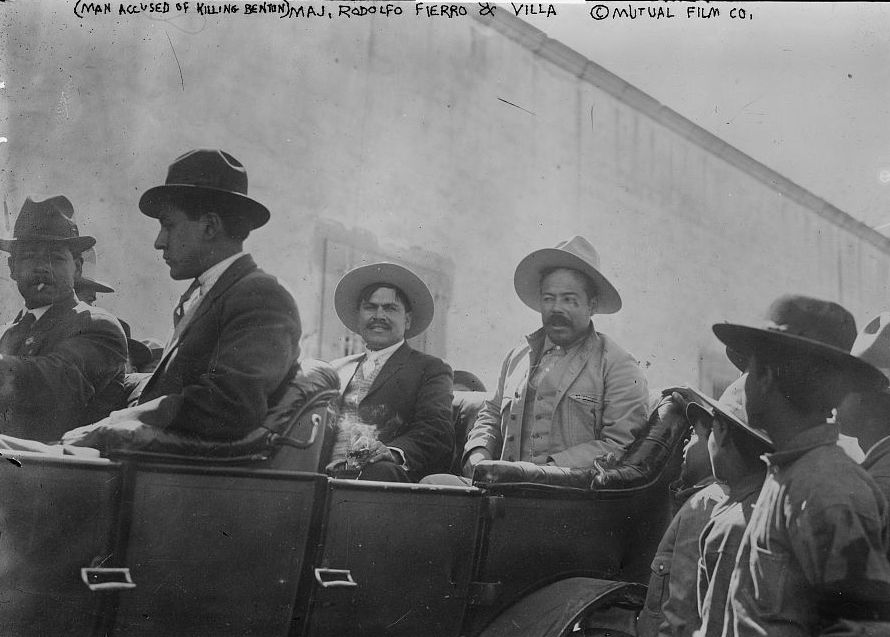
Generals Rodolfo Fierro and Francisco Villa

=== Commander ===
On 15 January 1915, Villa turned over command of the western forces to Fierro and Calixto Contreras. The decision was made following the election of Roque González Garza by the Mexico City Convention. Fierro and Contreras were defeated following being put in command. In Guadalajara, Jalisco on 17 January 1915, Fierro's forces were surprised by an attack and forced to flee to Irapuato, Guanajuato. Villa was forced to pull troops from Mexico City to North West Mexico to assist Fierro and Contreras. With the larger number of forces, (11,000 soldiers strong), Villa was able to take Guadalajara without a fight, Villa pursued but was repelled, after sustaining heavy casualties, he ordered a withdrawal moving himself and a large force of soldiers from the area. Fierro was again in charge of the west, and on March 22, attacked a well dug-in force at Tuxpan, Veracruz. Fierro was again defeated, losing two thousand men and eight hundred horses, the loss forced him to abandon Guadalajara as well.

== Death ==
On 14 October 1915, Fierro died after seemingly being thrown from his horse and landing in quicksand. At the time, Fierro was marching toward Cananea, Sonora when he encountered the quicksand at the Casas Grandes Lagoon. The weight of his belt, loaded with gold coins and material is said to have prevented him from being able to escape, although it is difficult to conceive great wealth in an army in frank defeat. His body was retrieved by Kingo Nonaka, a Japanese photographer and combat medic for the Mexican Revolution. He is buried at the Panteón de Dolores Chihuahua, Chihuahua Municipality, Chihuahua, Mexico.

== In film ==
In the film Villa Rides (1968), Fierro was portrayed by Charles Bronson.

Fierro was portrayed by Damián Alcázar in the 2003 HBO made-for-television film And Starring Pancho Villa as Himself.

== In books ==
The Friends of Pancho Villa (Berkeley: New York, 1996), a novel by James Carlos Blake. Fierro is the narrator of the novel. Fierro also appears in Blake's novel Under the Skin as the father of the novel's protagonist, Jimmy Youngblood.

"Les amis de Pancho Villa" Léonard Chemineau and James Carlos Blake (Rivages Noir Casterman, 2012), a graphic novelization of James Carlos Blake's The Friends of Pancho Villa.

"Tom Mix and Pancho Villa", (St. Martin's Press, 1982) a novel by Clifford Irving. Fierro is depicted as Villa's evil right-hand-man.

== See also ==
- Mexican Revolution
- Pancho Villa
