= Battle of Tierra Blanca =

1913 battle of the Mexican Revolution

- Part of the Mexican Revolution
Date	November 23–25, 1913
Location	Tierra Blanca, Chihuahua 31°26′0″N 106°28′0″W
Result	Major Constitutionalist Victory

Belligerents
Constitutionalists: División del Norte	Government: Federal Army

Commanders and leaders
Pancho Villa; E.L Holmdahl	José Inés Salazar

Strength
6,200	5,250–5,500

Casualties and losses
300 dead, 200 wounded	1000 dead, 600 wounded

The Battle of Tierra Blanca was fought in 1913 during the Mexican Revolution. It took place about 35 miles (56 km) south of Ciudad Juárez. The outcome was a major victory for Francisco "Pancho" Villa over the forces of José Inés Salazar, commander of the federal forces loyal to then head of state Victoriano Huerta.

The two armies were of relatively equal numbers, 5,500 of Villa's soldiers standing against an estimated 7,000 federal soldiers. But Salazar's troops were in theory more disciplined and had more artillery. The battle began on 23 November 1913; the first day saw fairly indecisive fighting, but before the actual clashes started Fierro had been sent south to destroy the railroad tracks, forcing the federal soldiers to halt.

On the second day, as Villa flanked the well armed federal soldiers with cavalry, a steam locomotive filled with dynamite and percussion caps was rammed into train cars provided for them. The resulting explosion caused Salazar's men to flee to nearby undamaged train cars in retreat. Villa's cavalry then overwhelmed the troopers. This attack, combined with Rodolfo Fierro's mission to explode armaments behind the lines, caused Salazar's forces to collapse.

Fierro is noted as riding on horseback after an escaping locomotive, climbing on to it, running across the roofs of the train cars, and shooting dead the boilerman and conductor, pulling the train to a complete stop. All federal soldiers captured were executed.

Villa captured 4 locomotives, 7 machine guns, horses, rifles and 400,000 rounds of small arms ammunition in the battle. The death toll stood around 1,000 federal soldiers killed and 300 of Villa's own.
