= División del Norte =

Armed faction during the Mexican Revolution

Northern Division
- División del Norte
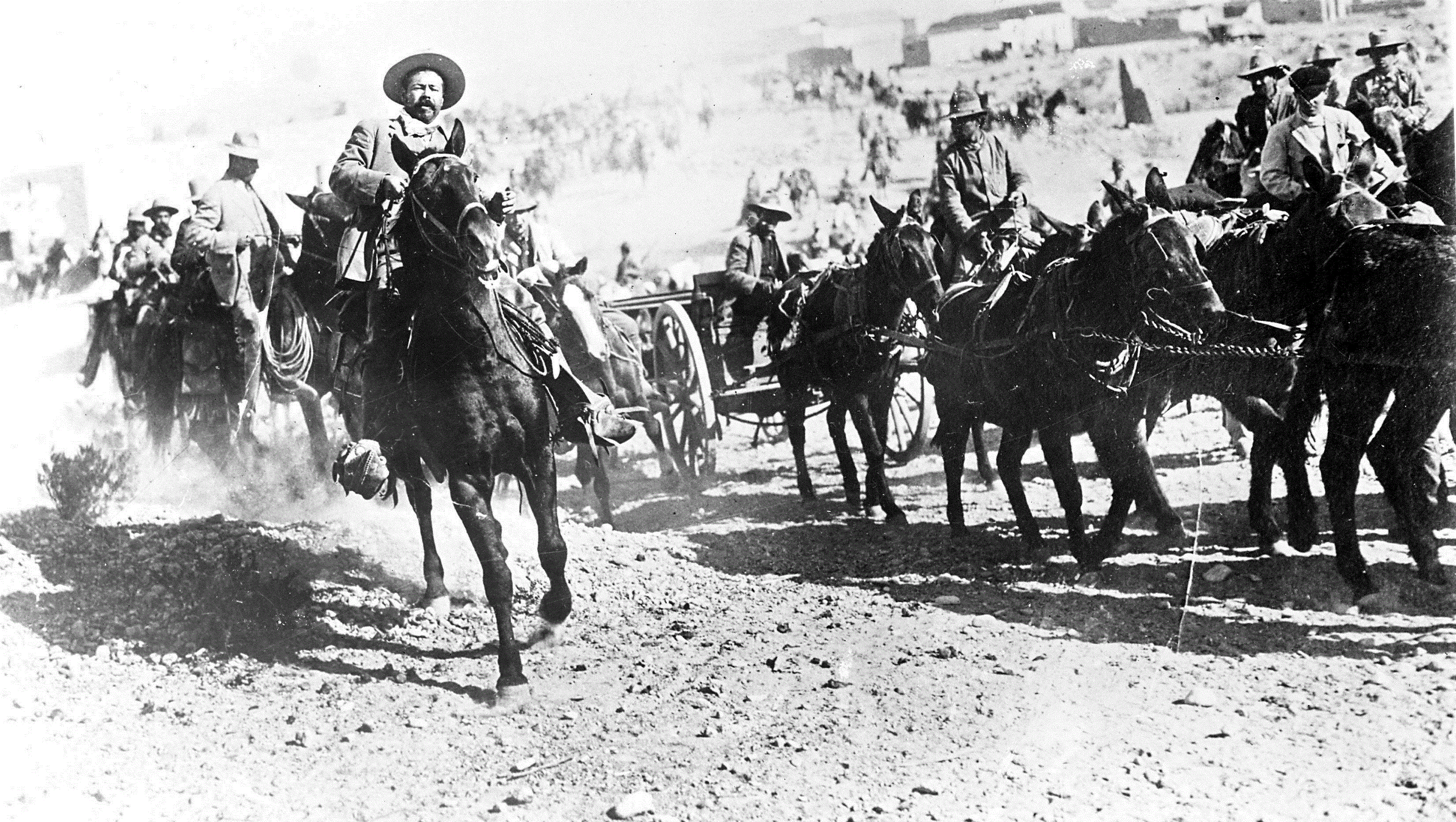
- General Pancho Villa at the head of the División del Norte
- Active: 1913–1920
- Disbanded: 1920
- Country: Mexico
- Allegiance: Constitutionalists (1913–1914); Conventionists (1914–1917)
- Type: Field army
- Size: 15,000–50,000
- Garrison/HQ: Chihuahua
- Engagements: Mexican Revolution: Battle of San Andrés; First Battle of Torreón; Second Battle of Ciudad Juárez; Battle of Tierra Blanca; Battle of Zaragoza; Battle of Ojinaga; Second Battle of Torreón; Battle of San Pedro de las Colonias; Battle of Paredón; Battle of Zacatecas; Battle of Ramos Arizpe; Battle of El Ébano; Battle of Celaya; Battle of León; Siege of Naco; Second Battle of Agua Prieta; Third Battle of Torreón; Border War; Second Battle of Nogales; Battle of Columbus; Pancho Villa Expedition; Battle of San Isidro; Battle of Aguacaliente; Battle of Puerto de Varas; Battle of Tomóchic; Battle of Guerrero; Third Battle of Ciudad Juárez

Commanders
- Commander-in-chief: Francisco Villa
- Chief of staff: Felipe Ángeles
- Notable commanders: Toribio Ortega; Tomás Urbina; Raúl Madero; Maclovio Herrera; Manuel Chao

Insignia
- Flag
- Ideology: Revolutionary nationalism; Agrarianism (regional and limited); Regional autonomy; Anti-Imperialism

The División del Norte (English: Northern Division) was a major revolutionary army during the Mexican Revolution under the leadership of Francisco "Pancho" Villa. Formed in 1913 from anti-Huerta guerrilla forces in northern Mexico, it functioned more as a full field army than a conventional military division, growing rapidly to become one of the largest and most effective revolutionary forces in Latin American history. At its peak it numbered between 15,000 and 50,000 troops.

Emphasizing cavalry mobility, modern logistics via railroads, and a relatively professionalized support structure that included a dedicated medical service, use of captured artillery under Felipe Ángeles, and a rudimentary air corps, it achieved decisive victories against the Federal Army under Victoriano Huerta.

After the break with Venustiano Carranza following the Convention of Aguascalientes, the División formed the core of the Conventionist Army and fought against the Constitutionalists. Heavy defeats at Celaya, León, and elsewhere largely destroyed it as a coherent field army. Surviving elements continued as irregular forces under Villa until the early 1920s.

== Formation ==
The División del Norte was formally constituted on 29 September 1913 at the Hacienda de la Loma, in what is now the Lerdo municipality of Durango. The name had previously been used by a Federal Army formation that operated in northern Mexico under the Porfiriato and during the early stages of the Revolution. In 1912 Villa’s irregular forces fought alongside this Federal unit against Pascual Orozco, but the 1913 organization was a new revolutionary force assembled from several irregular troops. Mexican historiography distinguishes the two units.

Northern revolutionary leaders from Chihuahua, Durango, and the Comarca Lagunera region, who had previously operated as semi-independent guerrilla groups against the Huerta regime, met to unify under a single command. Participants included figures such as Tomás Urbina, Maclovio Herrera, Calixto Contreras, Toribio Ortega, Eugenio Aguirre Benavides, and others. After discussion, Villa was elected supreme commander by acclamation.

== Organization ==
Villa adhered to Venustiano Carranza's Plan of Guadalupe and served as commander-in-chief. Felipe Ángeles, a professionally trained artillerist and former Federal officer who had served under President Francisco I. Madero, became one of Villa’s principal military advisers and chief of artillery from 1914.

The army itself was structured around a series of brigades of varying size and composition, drawn primarily from rural populations, including rancheros, vaqueros, miners, peons, and former local rebels. It was never a standardized force; its organization evolved with successive campaigns and the incorporation of additional forces.

Major components included:

- Brigada Morelos, under Tomás Urbina.
- Brigada Benito Juárez, under Maclovio Herrera.
- Brigada González Ortega, under Toribio Ortega.
- Brigada Cuauhtémoc, under Trinidad Rodríguez.
- Brigada Zaragoza, under Raúl Madero.

Supporting elements included the Dorados, Villa’s personal escort and elite mounted unit, Ángeles' divisionary artillery force, a medical brigade, and a general staff. The army also incorporated some former Federal officers and intellectuals after Madero’s fall. Command was relatively horizontal compared with Carranza’s northeastern forces; many brigade leaders had risen from local popular movements and retained significant autonomy.

== Equipment ==
El Niño, one of the División's most recognizable artillery pieces.

Experimental armored-vehicle. The inscription reads Brigada Zaragoza.

The División was better equipped and logistically more sophisticated than most other revolutionary forces of the period. It made extensive use of the railroad network built under the Porfiriato for rapid strategic movement of troops, artillery, and supplies across the long distances of northern Mexico. Villa’s forces captured significant quantities of arms and artillery from the Federal Army and Rurales, including Schneider-Canet and other field pieces. Under Felipe Ángeles, the artillery was organized into a more coherent technical arm rather than used in isolated batteries. By early 1914 the division’s artillery counted 28 guns

The army possessed machine guns, a dedicated sanitary service with hospital trains and horse-drawn ambulances, and efforts to mount larger portions of the infantry for greater mobility. Supply lines from the U.S. border were critical for ammunition and other materiel during the 1913–1914 campaigns.

=== Railway logistics and armored adaptations ===
Because of the vast distances involved, the railroad was the operational backbone of the División del Norte. Troops, artillery, and supplies regularly moved in long trains, and railway cars were adapted for combat. During the 1914 campaigns, the leading elements of repair and combat trains carried artillery on armored flatcars. John Reed, who accompanied Villa’s forces, described the famous 75 mm gun known as El Niño mounted on a steel-armored flatcar at the head of the repair train, with an open caisson of shells behind it. A second gun, El Chavalito, was mounted in the same fashion farther back in the train. Behind the artillery platforms came armored cars filled with soldiers, followed by cars carrying rails and ties for track repair.

=== Experimental road-rail armored vehicle ===
In early 1914 forces linked to the División del Norte, specifically the Brigada Zaragoza, constructed at least one purpose-built armored car. Based on a Mack truck chassis acquired near the border and armored in the workshops of the Compañía del Ferrocarril Nor-Oeste de México, the vehicle was dual-capable, road and rail. It was protected by layered steel plate with felt, carried several machine guns, and was intended to support the advance toward Torreón. It remained experimental and is not known to have been used in a major engagement.

=== Brigada Sanitaria ===
One of the most distinctive and innovative elements of the División del Norte’s organization was its dedicated medical service, organized as the Brigada Sanitaria. Prepared in Chihuahua for the 1914 Torreón campaign, it is described by participants and later accounts as the first systematically organized sanitary brigade of the Mexican Revolution.

Commanded by Dr. Andrés Villarreal, the brigade operated specialized hospital trains that accompanied the main body of the army. These included cars equipped as operating rooms and treatment rooms with instruments and medicines, cars for nurses, cars for infectious cases, and recovery facilities. The service also fielded horse-drawn ambulances, portable medical kits, and armed escorts for the protection of the medical convoy. Doctors held ranks of major and above; nurses held the rank of captain. Each medical officer commanded a small team of assistants, stretcher-bearers, mule teams, and an ambulance.

=== Air component ===
The División del Norte also operated a small experimental air component. Between 1914 and 1915 it acquired several aircraft, including a Curtiss biplane, Wright Model B machines, Moisant monoplanes, and a Christofferson biplane. Foreign pilots such as Lester P. Barlow and Edwin Charles Parsons were employed; the force was supported by a mobile rail-based aerodrome and maintenance train. The aircraft were used primarily for reconnaissance during the northern campaigns and the 1915 Bajío operations.

== Alliance with Zapata: Conventionist Army ==
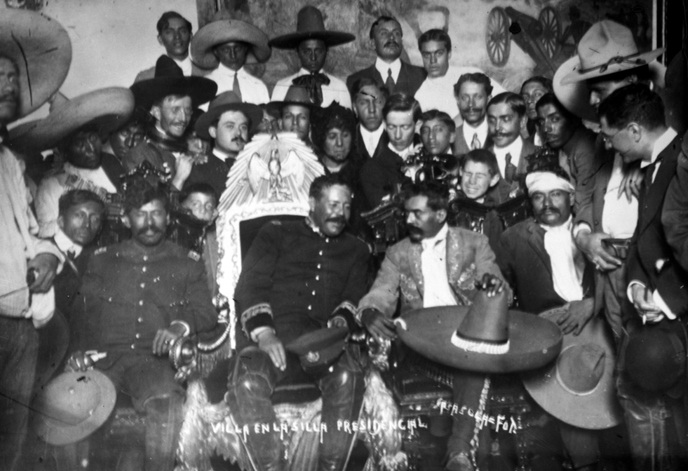
Pancho Villa and Emiliano Zapata in the National Palace during their occupation of Mexico City.

After Huerta’s resignation in July 1914, disagreements between Villa and Venustiano Carranza intensified. Carranza convened a meeting of revolutionary leaders in Mexico City; when Villa and the Zapatistas refused to attend under those conditions, the assembly relocated to Aguascalientes. The resulting Convention of Aguascalientes declared itself sovereign, elected Eulalio Gutiérrez as provisional president, and named Villa commander of its forces.

Villa and Emiliano Zapata formalized a military alliance at Xochimilco on 4 December 1914. The agreement included recognition of the agrarian provisions of the Plan de Ayala, mutual military cooperation against Carranza, and Villa’s commitment to supply the Ejército Libertador del Sur with arms and ammunition. On 6 December their combined forces, contemporary estimates range from roughly 50,000 to 60,000 men, entered Mexico City. Carranza withdrew to Veracruz.

The Conventionist coalition controlled the capital for several months and represented the main opposition to the Constitutionalists. In practice the alliance remained limited: Zapata returned to Morelos, the two armies were never fully integrated under a single command, and the subsequent campaign against Álvaro Obregón fell primarily on the División del Norte. Gutiérrez exercised no real authority even in Mexico City. The alliance lacked both a unified command and a common economic base. The defeats of 1915 in the Bajío ended the Conventionist challenge as a coherent national force.

== Campaigns ==
=== Anti-Huerta campaign (1913–1914) ===
Following its formal constitution, the División del Norte conducted a series of operations that successively broke Federal control across northern Mexico. Early actions included the capture of Torreón, the seizure of Ciudad Juárez by a ruse involving a coal train, the Battle of Tierra Blanca, and the reduction of the Federal stronghold at Ojinaga.

In March–April 1914 the army returned to the Laguna for the Second Battle of Torreón. After securing the Laguna, the División advanced southward, defeating Federal forces at San Pedro de las Colonias and Paredón.

The decisive action of the anti-Huerta campaign was the Battle of Zacatecas. Zacatecas was a critical railroad junction controlling the lines from the north toward the center of the country. Federal commander Luis Medina Barrón had fortified the surrounding heights, particularly La Bufa and El Grillo. Villa concentrated the bulk of the División del Norte against the city despite Carranza’s instructions to send only limited reinforcements to the forces already under Pánfilo Natera. Ángeles’ artillery systematically reduced the Federal positions before the infantry and cavalry assaults. The victory destroyed the last major Federal field army in the north, opened the route toward Mexico City, and contributed directly to Victoriano Huerta’s resignation on 15 July 1914.

Villa’s independent decision to commit the full division at Zacatecas, against Carranza’s orders, produced an open rupture.

=== Conventionist campaign (1914–1915) ===
After Huerta's resignation and the break between factions the Conventionists conducted operations on several fronts. In the south, Zapata's Ejército Libertador del Sur conducted a major offensive into Puebla immediately after the Xochimilco pact and the joint entry into Mexico City. With roughly 20,000 men, Zapatista forces defeated Carrancista troops under Fortunato Maycotte near Texmelucan, captured Cholula, and occupied the city of Puebla itself on or about 15–16 December 1914 after a full day of fighting. The occupation was short-lived. In early January 1915 Obregón’s reorganized Constitutionalist forces retook the city, after which Zapata withdrew the bulk of his troops to Morelos.

In the northeast, Felipe Ángeles commanded an independent campaign that opened with a feint toward Saltillo, drawing Carrancista forces away. The battle at Ramos Arizpe on 8 January 1915 was fought in dense fog with instances of friendly fire; Monterrey subsequently fell. Ángeles treated a portion of the prisoners relatively leniently and announced moderate policies on religion and property. While holding governorships and military command over the states of Coahuila and Nuevo León, he advocated a more cautious strategy of consolidating the north, lengthening Carrancista supply lines, and preparing a defensive position rather than seeking a decisive battle in the Bajío; his counsel was not followed.

In the Bajío, Villa and Obregón clashed at Celaya and León. Obregón chose Celaya in part because of its irrigation ditches, which were well suited to trench warfare and machine-gun defense. At Celaya in April 1915 Villa refused Ángeles’s advice to wait for ammunition and to cut Obregón’s communications with Veracruz. He attacked without proper reconnaissance, committed no reserves, and relied on repeated frontal cavalry charges against prepared positions with barbed wire and machine guns. In the second battle Obregón reported roughly 3,000 Villistas dead, 6,000 prisoners, and 32 cannons lost. After Celaya, Ángeles again urged a northern withdrawal to exhaust Obregón’s forces; Villa refused and made a stand at León. The battle of León lasted nearly 40 days and took on the character of trench warfare; on 5 June the Villistas suffered more than 3,000 casualties and retreated in disorder. Friedrich Katz attributes the disasters primarily to strategic errors; failure to heed Ángeles, underestimation of Obregón, and reliance on frontal assaults, rather than to an immutable numerical or material inferiority.

In the north, Villista and allied forces under Manuel Chao and later Tomás Urbina conducted a prolonged siege of the Carrancista position at El Ébano, San Luis Potosí, from March–May 1915. The defenders, commanded by Jacinto B. Treviño, held fortified positions protecting the railroad and the oil fields. After roughly seventy-two days of fighting the attackers failed to break the position and withdrew. The failure at El Ébano, occurring in parallel with the Bajío defeats, further reduced Conventionist strategic momentum.

In the northwest, Conventionist-aligned forces under José María Maytorena operated around the Sonora border towns. Later in 1915, after the Bajío disasters, Villa himself moved remaining troops into Sonora. The attempt to take Agua Prieta in early November 1915 failed; U.S. recognition of Carranza permitted Constitutionalist reinforcements to be moved by rail through American territory. Searchlights illuminated the field during the night attack of 1 November; Villa believed they were stationed on the U.S. side.

Immediately afterward he issued a long, bitter manifesto accusing Carranza of selling the country for American support. Surviving elements shifted to guerrilla operations. Many former officers and rank-and-file dispersed; others remained with Villa.

=== Guerrilla phase, and disbandment (1915–1920) ===
In early 1916 Villa ordered attacks on American personnel and property in northern Mexico, culminating in the raid on Columbus, New Mexico. The raid prompted the U.S. Punitive Expedition under Brigadier General John J. Pershing, which entered Chihuahua in mid-March. Villa was wounded early in the pursuit and went into hiding, but he was not captured. By late summer and autumn 1916 he had rebuilt sufficient strength for a series of operations against Carrancista garrisons.

In September 1916 his forces briefly entered Chihuahua City, seized the penitentiary and government buildings, liberated prisoners, and withdrew with additional arms, ammunition, and recruits. A larger engagement followed in late November; U.S. reports again recorded Villa’s forces penetrating the city, capturing positions, and departing with supplies and men who had joined him. These actions occurred while Pershing’s expedition was still operating in the state. The inability of both U.S. and Carrancista forces to eliminate him enhanced his standing among many in Chihuahua.

Pershing’s forces withdrew in early February 1917 without capturing Villa. Thereafter Villa continued irregular warfare against Carrancista troops in Chihuahua, conducting raids, temporary occupations of smaller towns, and hit-and-run operations through 1919–1920 remainign a regional guerrilla presence capable of contesting government control in the state.

After the overthrow and death of Carranza in 1920, the interim government of Adolfo de la Huerta negotiated a settlement. Villa made peace overtures to de la Huerta, who saw political advantage in pacifying the north. Contact was made through the Mexican newspaperman Elías Torres. Villa accepted amnesty, disarmed most of his remaining men, and retired to the hacienda Canutillo in Durango.

== Legacy ==
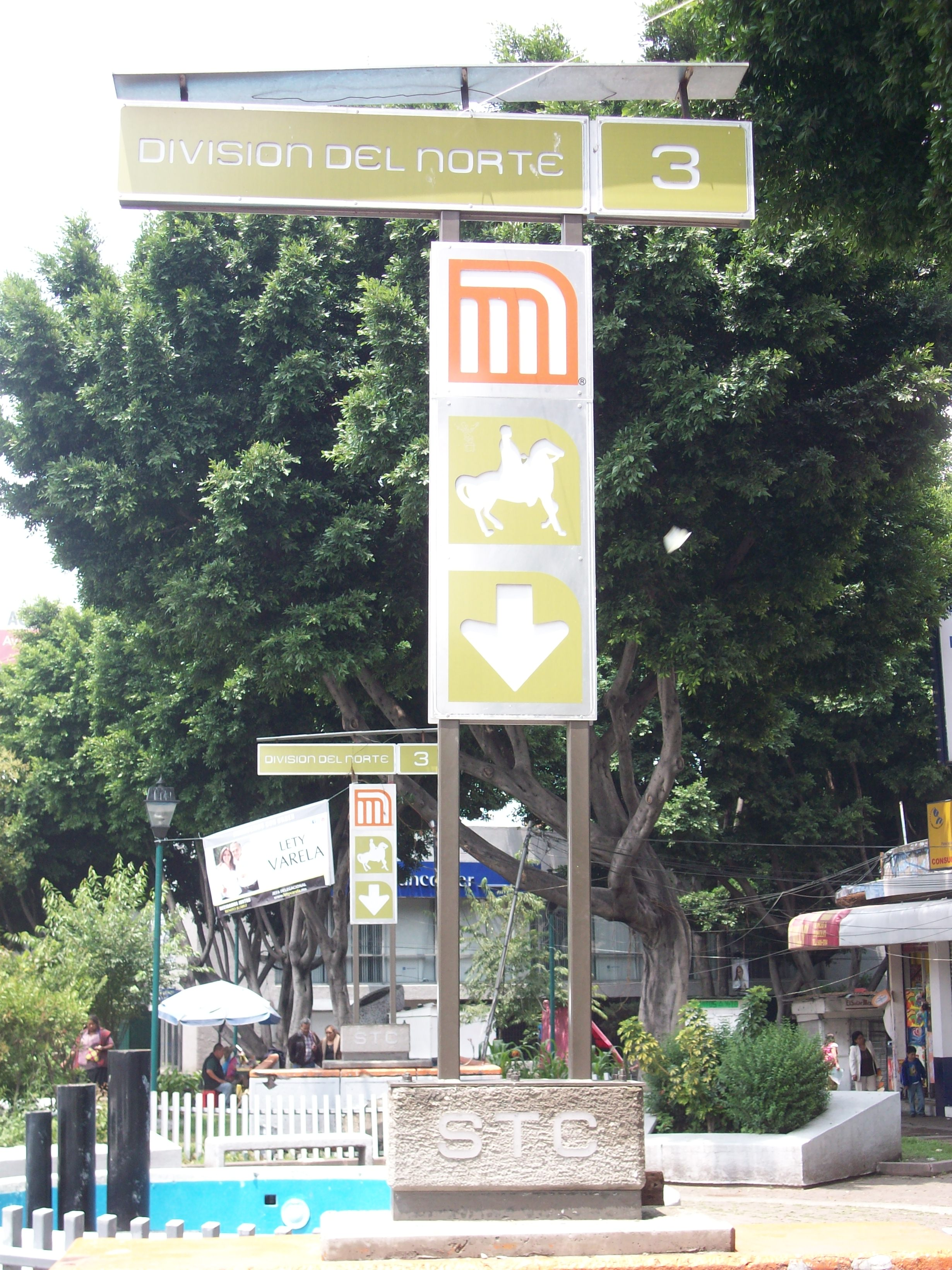
Metro División del Norte with stylized image of Pancho Villa

In 1980 the Mexico City metro opened the Metro División del Norte station on Line 3. A major avenue in the city also bears the name. The station logo is a stylized portrait of Villa.

=== Popular culture ===
The División del Norte and its commander became central subjects of Mexican popular culture, especially through the corrido tradition. These ballads functioned as oral history for largely illiterate audiences and helped construct a heroic, often idealized image of Villa and his army. Well-known examples include “La Toma de Zacatecas,” which recounts the 23 June 1914 battle; “La Persecución de Villa,” about the Columbus raid and the subsequent U.S. Punitive Expedition.

== See also ==
- Pancho Villa
- Felipe Ángeles
- Factions in the Mexican Revolution
- Ejército Libertador del Sur
- Convention of Aguascalientes
- Pancho Villa Expedition
