= Constitutionalists in the Mexican Revolution =

Faction of the Mexican Revolution (1910-20) which followed Pres. Venustiano Carranza

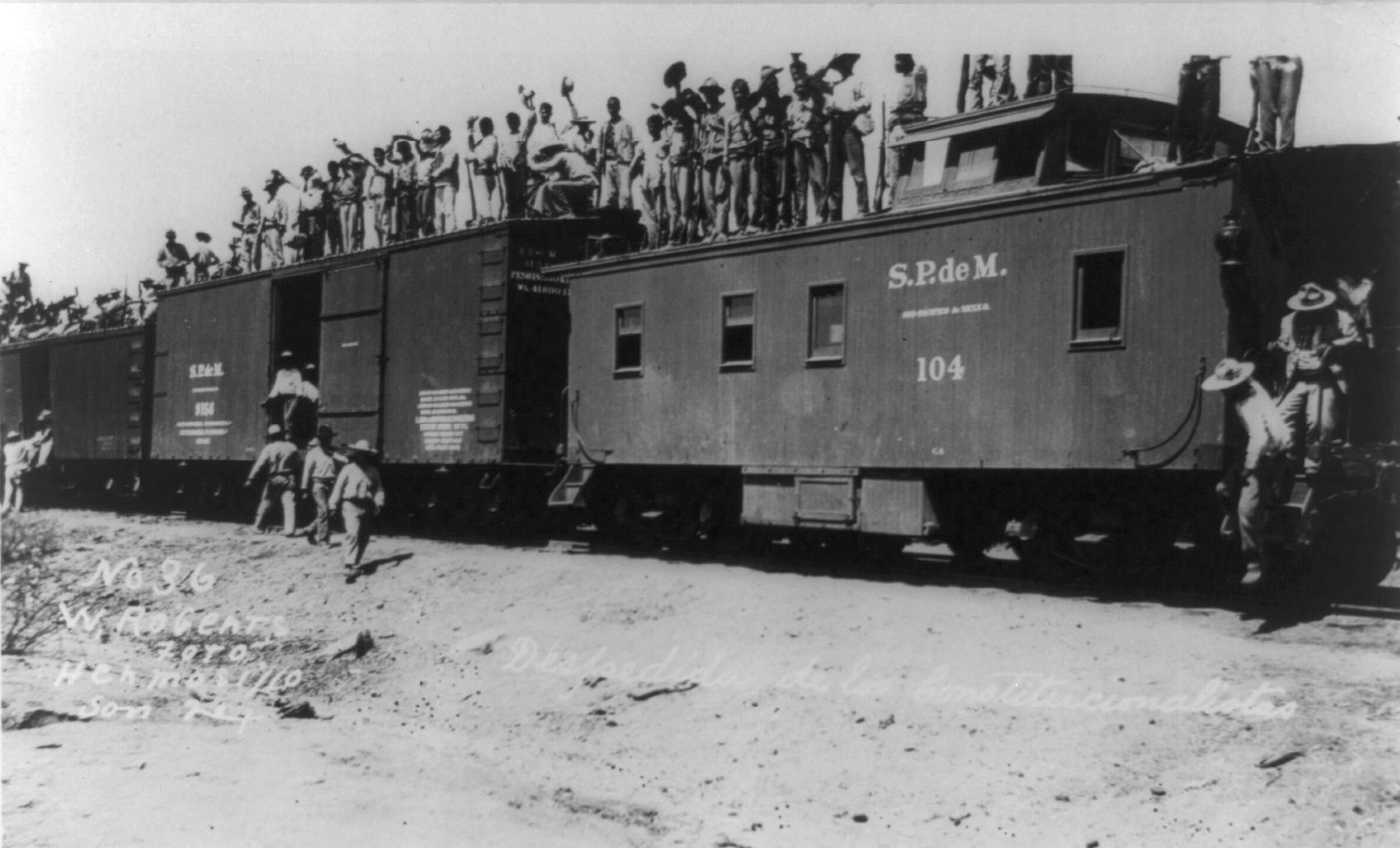
Mexican Constitutionalist soldiers standing on top of railroad cars of an S.P.deM. train during the Mexican Revolution, c. 1914

The Constitutionalists (Spanish: Constitucionalistas) were a faction in the Mexican Revolution (1910–1920). They were formed in 1914 as a response to the assassination of Francisco Madero and Victoriano Huerta's coup d'etat. Also known as Carrancistas, taking that name from their leader, Venustiano Carranza, the governor of Coahuila. The Constitutionalists played the leading role in defeating the Mexican Federal Army on the battlefield. Carranza, a centrist liberal attracted Mexicans across various political ideologies to the Constitutionalist cause. Constitutionalists consisted of mainly middle-class urbanites, liberals, and intellectuals who desired a democratic constitution under the guidelines "Mexico for Mexicans" and Mexican nationalism. Their support for democracy in Mexico caught the attention of the United States, who aided their cause. In 1914, the United States occupied Mexico's largest port in Veracruz in an attempt to starve Huerta's government of customs revenue. They crafted and enforced the Mexican Constitution of 1917 which remains in force today. Following the defeat of General Huerta, the Constitutionalists outmaneuvered their former revolutionary allies Emiliano Zapata and Pancho Villa becoming the victorious faction of the Mexican Revolution. However the Constitutionalists were divided amongst themselves and Carranza was assassinated in 1920. He was succeeded by General Álvaro Obregón who began enforcing the 1917 constitution and calming revolutionary tensions. His assassination and the subsequent power vacuum this created spurred his successor, Plutarco Elías Calles to create the National Revolutionary Party (PNR) which would hold uninterrupted political power in Mexico until 2000.

== Revolutionary factions ==
Although not as visible as the two other main factions in the Mexican Revolution because of their lack of a highly charismatic leader like Emiliano Zapata or Pancho Villa, there was a third group vying for power during the fighting in Mexico, and they played a critical role mainly because in the end, they won. This faction was known as the Constitutionalists, and consisted of predominantly of liberal intellectuals and middle-class citizens – in other words, Mexicans who were not of purely indigenous backgrounds but also not of the elite class, and who therefore did not benefit all that much from the foreign investment boom of the Díaz reign. The Constitutionalists differed from the Zapatistas and Villa's men, who were fighting for a mostly singular cause. They did call for ejidos (or common lands) to be returned to villages and for large estates to be divided up, although not to the extent that Zapata wanted, as this was his primary goal in the Revolution. They also demanded a nationalization of all Mexican land and resources under foreign control, which is something all Mexicans wanted. However, these liberals also realized that the Mexican prosperity of the Diaz period had sacrificed many rights of the Mexican citizen, and also left law and order in the hands of a dictator who could bend it at his will. They sought to end Mexico's struggle with a constitution that had only Mexico's Hacienda owners interests at heart.

== Francisco Madero's impact ==
The rise of the Constitutionalists actually began at the end of the 19th century, before an official "revolution" broke out. Porfirio Díaz was still in power, but the nation of Mexico was beginning to brim with rebellious sentiments. By 1900, a small group had actually formed that officially labeled themselves as anti-Diaz. With this groups' formation, the Mexican peoples' resentment for the Diaz regime began to make itself apparent. More and more uprisings began to take place, especially in areas where foreign businesses owned interests. In 1904, three liberal brothers, Jesús, Enrique, and Ricardo Flores Magón, published a liberal journal in which they issued a call to revolution. With this publication came an unexpected ally – Francisco Madero, who was the son of a wealthy hacienda owner. Madero began to publicly denounce Díaz and tour the country to talk of free elections, democracy and social change. Because of harassment by Díaz, he joined the Flores Magón brothers and other Mexican liberals in El Paso, Texas, where he continued to fuel the fires of revolution from afar.

In 1910, with the issuance of the Plan of San Luis Potosi by Madero, Mexico, for the first time in its history, was thrust into a full-blown revolution. Because of the writings of Madero, the Flores Magón brothers and other Constitutionalists (although they were still just labeled liberals), people from every social class and from every ethnic background rose up to answer the revolution's call. During this time not only did leaders such as Zapata and Villa arise, but many Constitutionalists, most of them lawyers, journalists or leading intellectuals, also gained in power and popularity. By the time Díaz agreed to step down and Madero was elected president, the Constitutionalists had gained a power base in most of Mexico's urban population centers, which were mainly located in the center of the country. Zapata held most of the southern regions where the people of indigenous descent were located, and Pancho Villa led the northern areas dominated mostly by ranchers and miners.

== Rise of Venustiano Carranza ==
Madero's presidency proved to be short-lived, as he alienated almost all of his supporters by refusing to enact land reforms and developing weak and unsatisfactory programs for social change. General Victoriano Huerta eventually staged a coup that overthrew Madero and installed himself as president. His authoritarian and brutal methods of ruling, however, soon united the Constitutionalists, who were now being led by Venustiano Carranza, with Zapata and Villa in overthrowing Huerta. Carranza replaced Huerta as president of Mexico in 1913 after the U.S. intervention at Veracruz forced Huerta to abdicate. In 1914, all the leaders of the Revolution met at the Convention of Aguascalientes in order to decide on a plan of action for the future. The Convention was quickly reduced to arguments, as Carranza could not agree with Zapata and Villa, who thought he was too power-hungry and not a true leader of the revolution. An especially sensitive subject was the issue of rights for Indians, in which supporters of Zapata accused Carranza and the Constitutionalists of favoring the "heirs of the conquerors who continue abuse and cheat the oppressed Indians." Carranza was removed as president, and Villa's forces occupied Mexico City. However, the urban centers continued to be powerhouses of Constitutionalist support, and Villa's actions in the capital soon forced him to leave in 1915. Constitutionalist forces continued to hound him until he was defeated in battle in April 1915. The United States officially recognized Carranza as the president of Mexico in 1916, and in 1917, the population elected him.

== Constitution of 1917 ==
Carranza's most important action as a Constitutionalist leader came in 1917, when the Constitution of 1917 was published. It was the culmination of most of the Revolution's goals, and perhaps the most important document in modern Mexican history. The signing of this document also began the reign of the Constitutionalists. Although Carranza was not in power long enough to enact many changes, his successors would strengthen the Constitutionalist movement in the 1920s. Zapata and Villa were assassinated, along with any other caudillo that threatened the power of the Constitutionalists and thereby solidifying their position. Later on, they would fight against the Cristeros, who were pro–Catholic Church rebels in the northern regions. But perhaps the most important move the Constitutionalists enacted was the establishment of a one-party system. This single party (the PRI) would dominant Mexican politics until the later years of the 20th century.

== See also ==
- Constitutional Army

== General sources ==
- Chasteen, John Charles. Born in Blood and Fire: A Concise History of Latin America. New York: W. W. Norton and Company Inc, 2001.
- Stefoff, Rebecca. Independence and Revolution in Mexico. New York: Facts On File Inc, 1993.
- Tannenbaum, Frank. Peace by Revolution: Mexico After 1910. United States of America, Columbia University Press, 1993.
