= Lucio Blanco =

Mexican revolutionary

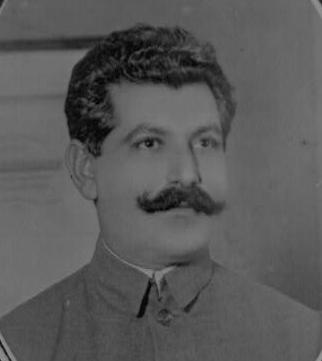
- Lucio Blanco in 1914
- Born: July 21, 1879
- Died: June 1922
- Occupation: Military Officer
- Known for: Participation in the Mexican Revolution of 1910 to 1920

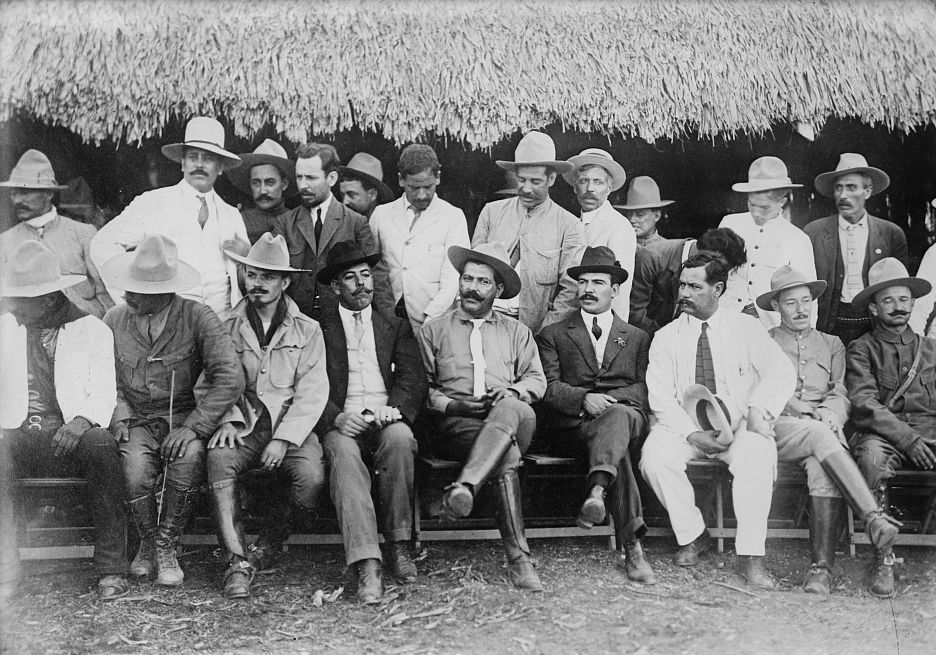
Blanco and staff circa 1913

Lucio Blanco (July 21, 1879 – June 1922) was a Mexican military officer and revolutionary, noteworthy for his participation in the Mexican Revolution of 1910 to 1920.

== Biography ==
Lucio Blanco was born on July 21, 1879, in Nadadores, Coahuila. He is noted for three major accomplishments. Forces under his command accomplished the first major victory of the Constitutional forces against the Federal forces of General Victoriano Huerta's government by taking the city of Matamoros in June 1913. In August 1913, he became the first revolutionary to distribute hacienda land to the peasantry. In late 1914, he was the driving force of the moderate generals who wished to bring peace between the victorious Constitutional factions who began quarreling among themselves. His efforts resulted in the Convention of Aguascalientes in October 1914.

Lucio Blanco was the son of Bernardo Blanco, and Maria Fuentes, prominent landowners. He attended primary school in Muzquiz, Coahuila, and secondary school in the state capital of Saltillo. He also spent several months in Texas, studying English. He finished his secondary schooling in Monterrey. At the age of twenty, he entered a private college in Torreón. He did not graduate, but returned home to manage this parent’s property in Muzquiz.

Because of family connections, Blanco became a supporter of Francisco I. Madero, and in the decade before the revolution, helped set up political clubs of Madero supporters in Coahuila. Blanco also became a supporter of the well-known anarchist Ricardo Flores Magón, and in 1906, attempted to join a Flores Magón rebellion. He was dissuaded however, and returned home.

In 1909, he joined the Anti-Reelection Party of Madero and became active in organizing political rallies. He associated himself with Jesús Carranza, brother of Venustiano Carranza, and when hostilities broke out in late 1910, Blanco joined the forces of Jesús Carranza. With the conclusion of hostilities in May 1911, Blanco took a position within the Ministry of Interior of the interim government. Blanco had political disagreements with the Minister of Interior, and so he left the capital and returned to Coahuila.

At this time, Venustiano Carranza was the Maderist governor of Coahuila, and he advised Blanco to join the State militia. In early 1912, General Pascual Orozco revolted against the Madero government, and Carranza mobilized the State militia to battle the Orozco forces attempting to operate in Coahuila. Despite having no military training, Blanco impressed his superiors, and by the time hostilities ended in the summer of 1912, Blanco had been promoted to captain.

In February 1913, a conservative coup d’état removed Madero as President and established General Victoriano Huerta as the new President. Governor Carranza of Coahuila elected not to support this new government, and organized a resistance. Lucio Blanco was an early supporter of this revolt, and he received a commission as colonel in the Constitutional Forces.

Initially, Governor Carranza attempted to lead his revolt in the field, but his results were not successful. Early successes in this revolt came not from forces under Carranza’s direct command, but other forces in Sonora and Chihuahua. The exception was Lucio Blanco. In April 1913, Blanco had his first battlefield victory when he took the city of Aldamas, Tamaulipas, from forces loyal to Huerta. By the end of the month, he controlled a substantial portion of the country side of the state of Tamaulipas. His most important triumph was the taking of the border city of Matamoros from federal troops on June 4, 1913, the first major victory of the Constitutionalists. His soldiers, however, committed atrocities for which Blanco was blamed.

Carranza promoted Blanco to the rank of brigadier general for having taken the city of Matamoros, but this early glory was short lived. In July 1913, Carranza appointed Pablo González commander the new department of the Northeast, bypassing Blanco. Slighted, Blanco refused to cooperate with González, and remained in Matamoros as a military governor, in command of 1,800 soldiers, most stationed in Matamoros.

On August 30, 1913, Blanco, on his own initiative, distributed the lands of the hacienda Los Borregos, belonging to Félix Díaz, nephew of the old dictator, to the peons living on the hacienda, thus being the first to implement an agrarian reform distribution in the Revolution. For this, Emiliano Zapata wrote to him, congratulating him for his actions; this started a correspondence friendship with Zapata. Carranza, however, was disappointed with Blanco’s action, and accused him of exceeding his authority. As punishment, Blanco was recalled and ordered to Sonora to serve under General Álvaro Obregón. Blanco’s regiment was placed under the command of General Pablo González. This action by Carranza prevented Blanco from becoming a national hero, alongside Francisco Villa and Emiliano Zapata.

Under Obregón, Blanco was charged to organize and command the cavalry division of the Army of the Northwest. He was at the forefront of all of Obregón’s victories and his principal accomplishments were the taking of the cities of Tepic and Guadalajara, the last one considered to be his greatest triumph after Matamoros.

About this time, the split between Carranza and Pancho Villa was becoming open and bitter. Villa wrote Obregón explaining his position and asking for his support. Obregón advised Villa not to quarrel with Carranza, and then wrote to Carranza saying that he would support Carranza in his quarrels with Pancho Villa. Blanco objected Obregón’s position. A few days later, Obregón shocked Blanco when he said he advocated establishing a new dictatorship, stronger than that of Díaz. “After all, Díaz’ only crime was growing old.”

Still, Blanco rode in alongside Obregón into Mexico City in August 1914 when Huerta and his government collapsed. The Zapatistas armies also were marching toward the capital. Blanco, being sympathetic to Zapata’s land reform program, gave orders for his forces to receive them cordially. He personally greeted the Zapatistas leaders when they arrived.

During the final months of 1914, Blanco was one of the most powerful generals in Mexico City. However, both Carranza and Obregón began to doubt his loyalty, and suspected that he would defect with his army and join Pancho Villa’s forces, and he fell out of favor. This was the beginning of Blanco’s decline. Soon, Carranza considered him untrustworthy, and Blanco’s disagreements with Obregón escalated, especially as a result of his actions during the Convention of Aguascalientes in October. The Convention attempted to establish a new government and asked Carranza to step down. When Carranza refused, the Convention participants split into two factions: the Constitutionalists headed by Carranza and Obregón, and the Conventionists, nominally headed by Eulalio Gutiérrez, but actually under the control of Villa and Zapata. Blanco elected not to follow Carranza and Obregón and instead aligned himself with the Conventionists and Eulalio Gutiérrez. Gutiérrez, however, could not control Villa and Zapata, and so he attempted to force both of them out of his government. Blanco supported Gutiérrez, and Gutiérrez lost. Then in late January 1915, Blanco lost the support of Zapata because he refused to attack Pablo González at Querétaro. Zapata asked Villa to arrest and hold him for execution.

During the first half of 1915, Gutiérrez, Blanco and several other moderate generals attempted to govern independent of Carranza, Villa and Zapata, but the tide was against them. In June, Gutiérrez renounced all claims to the presidency and made peace with Carranza. But there was to be no forgiveness for Blanco. In September, he was captured by Obregon’s forces, and tried for treason. He was found guilty of insubordination, and sentenced to five years in prison. Because of animosity between Obregón and Blanco, Blanco remained in prison while Obregón served as Secretary of War. After Obregón retired in May 1917, Carranza arranged for Blanco to be re-tried in September 1917. At this trial, he was acquitted, and after his release, he exiled himself to Laredo, Texas.

In November 1919, Carranza recalled Blanco from Texas. Carranza was increasingly fearful that Obregón would turn against him, and he hoped that with Blanco’s support, the army would remain loyal. He acted as a mediator with the Zapata forces and was instrumental in concluding a peace between the Carranza government and Gildardo Magaña, Zapata’s successor. As the 1920 election approached, it became apparent that Obregón would run against Carranza’s candidate. Because of the continued animosity between Blanco and Obregón, Blanco supported Carranza against Obregón.

In 1920, Obregón and his supporters overthrew the Carranza government. Blanco attempted to flee with Carranza to Veracruz, but when their way was blocked, he parted company with Carranza and fled back to Laredo, Texas. There he joined with other exiles opposed to Obregón, and published pamphlets and conspired to start an armed revolt.

Lucio Blanco was last seen alive at a party in Laredo, Texas, in June 1922. The next day, his body was found across the border in Nuevo Laredo. It is generally believed that Mexican secret agents led Blanco to believe that some officers in Nuevo Laredo were eager to have him lead them in a revolt against the Obregón government. Blanco agreed to their proposal, and they crossed the Rio Grande that evening. When they reached the Mexican shore, government agents tried to arrest Blanco. In the ensuing struggle, Blanco was killed.

The international airport in Reynosa, Tamaulipas is named in his honor.
