= Parque de la Bombilla =

Public park in Mexico

Coordinates: 19.3472°N 99.1860°W

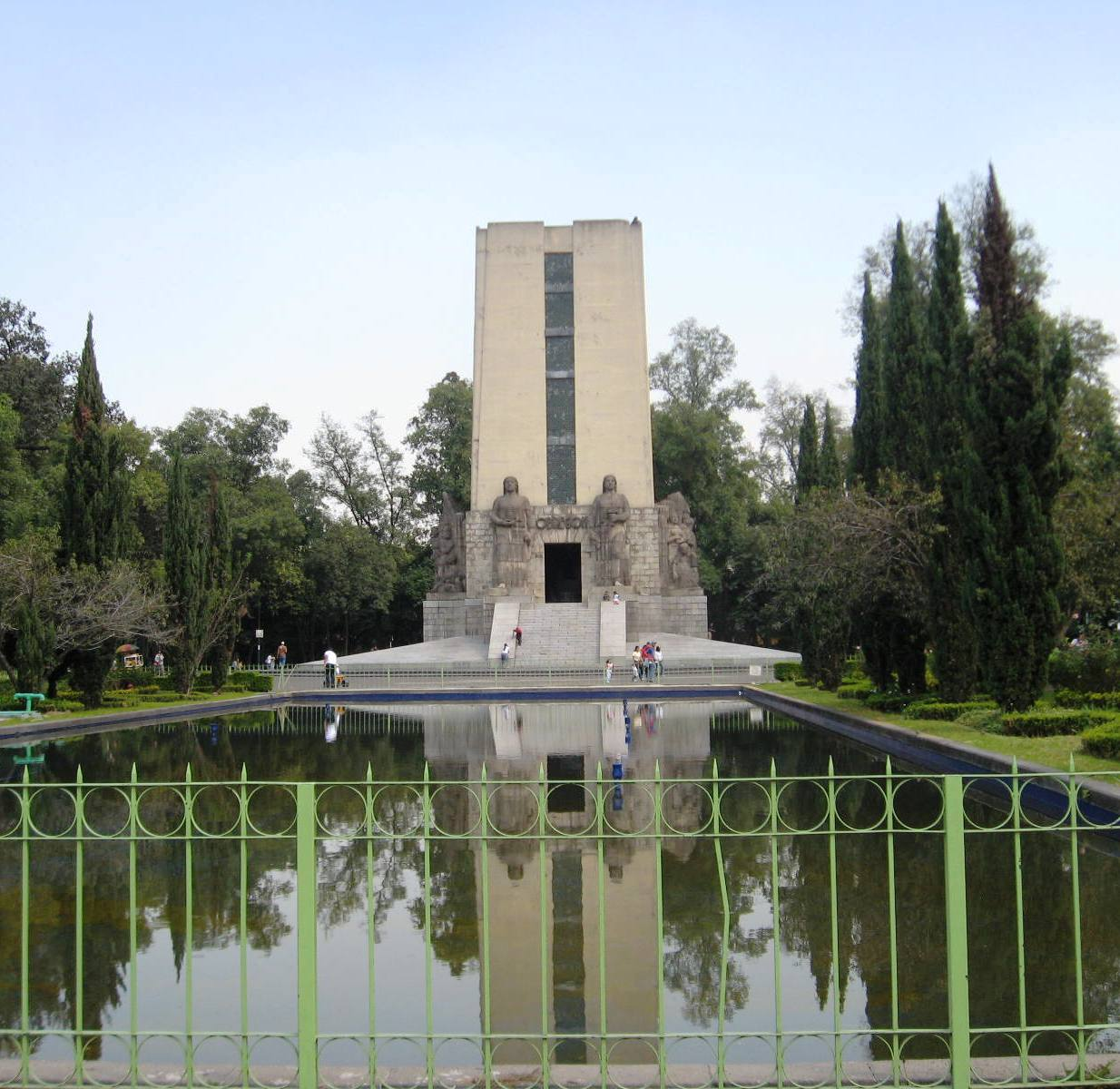
- Monument to Álvaro Obregón at Parque de la Bombilla
- Interactive map of Parque de la Bombilla
- Type: Public park
- Location: San Ángel, Álvaro Obregón, Mexico City Mexico
- Created: 1935

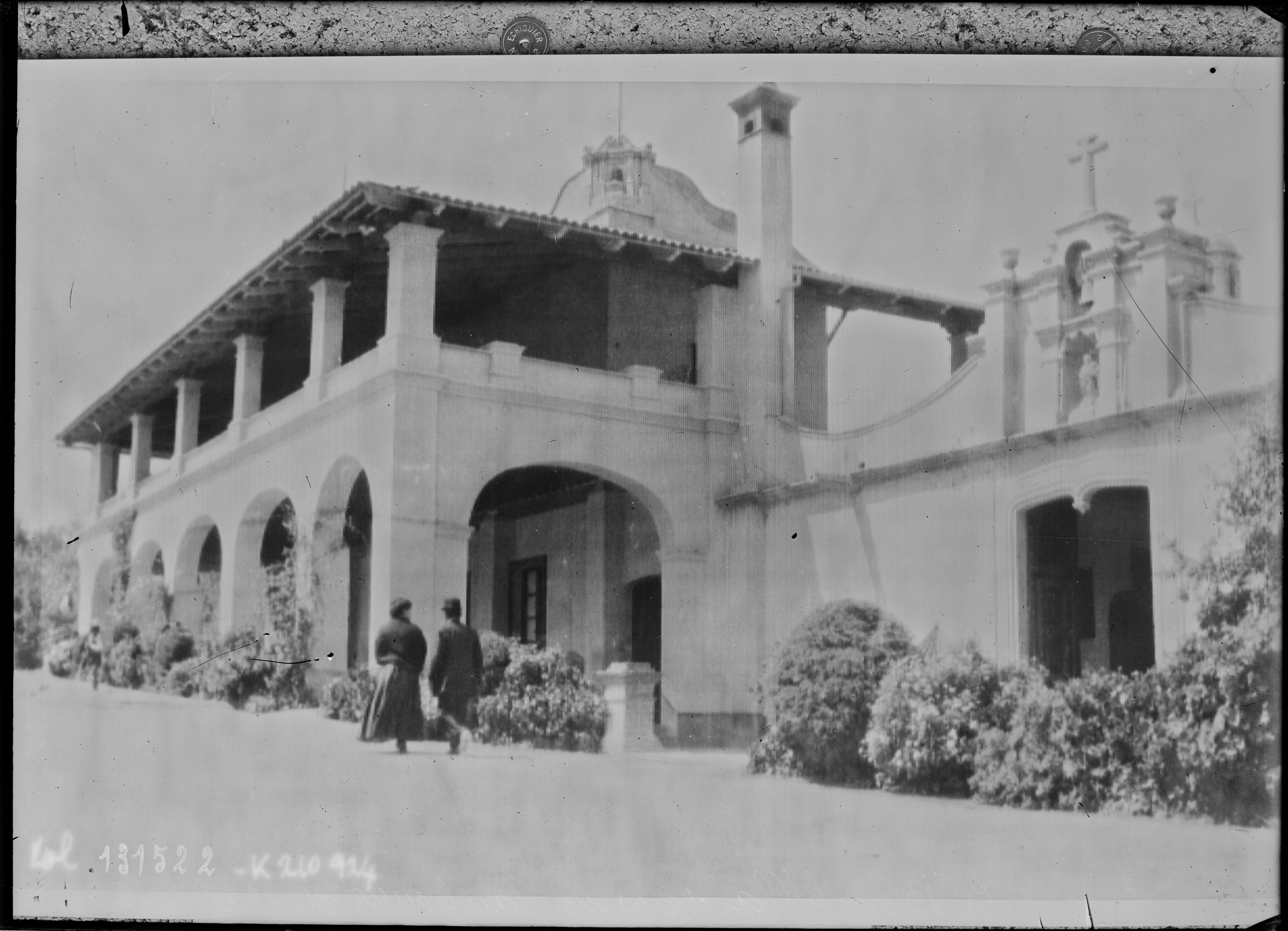
La Bombilla in 1928

Parque de la Bombilla is a public park and historic site located in the neighborhood of San Ángel, Álvaro Obregón district, south of Mexico City. The park and the monument memorialize revolutionary general Álvaro Obregón, who served as president of Mexico from 1920 to 1924 and was president-elect in 1928 when he was assassinated by José de León Toral, a Roman Catholic opposed to the government's anti-Catholic policies, while dining at the restaurant "La Bombilla", now the site of the monument. The monument complex opened on July 17, 1935, on the seventh anniversary of the assassination.

== History ==
On the morning of July 17, 1928, Obregón was invited out to lunch by the deputies of the State of Guanajuato at the restaurant La Bombilla. The assassin, José de León Toral, rushed to the scene after several days of surveilling Obregón and posed as a cartoonist. He drew a picture of several deputies and Obregón. Toral then drew his pistol and fired six shots at Obregón, who died at the scene. The murderer was quickly arrested and some policemen tried to kill him, but a deputy, Ricardo Topete, protected Toral, arguing the importance of solving the crime. Toral was later convicted of Obregón's murder and executed by firing squad.

In 1933 the site was expropriated by the government for a monument. A competition for the commission was held in 1934. The project was designed by architect Enrique Aragón Echegaray. The interior of the building includes an octagonal plan and, on the lower level, included a jar with Obregón's arm (which he had lost in battle) preserved in formaldehyde.

Construction of the park began in June 1934 during the presidency of General Abelardo L. Rodríguez and opened on the seventh anniversary of the assassination on July 17, 1935.

== Features ==
The main element of La Bombilla Park is the monument to Obregón which is at the main entrance starting north and going south. Its location and the dimensions of the structure allow clear visibility and its size emphasizes Álvaro Obregón's importance. The monument occupies a large plaza.

In 2015 the government of Mexico City started renovating the park, completely renewing the main fountain and adding seven new fountains in surrounding roundabouts, along with 24 new trees, 46 new benches, and 143 new lights, and repairing 26,198 square meters of green space. The renovations included 37% more space for pedestrians, including 16 new pedestrian crossings and 6,958 square meters of pedestrian trails.

== Gallery ==
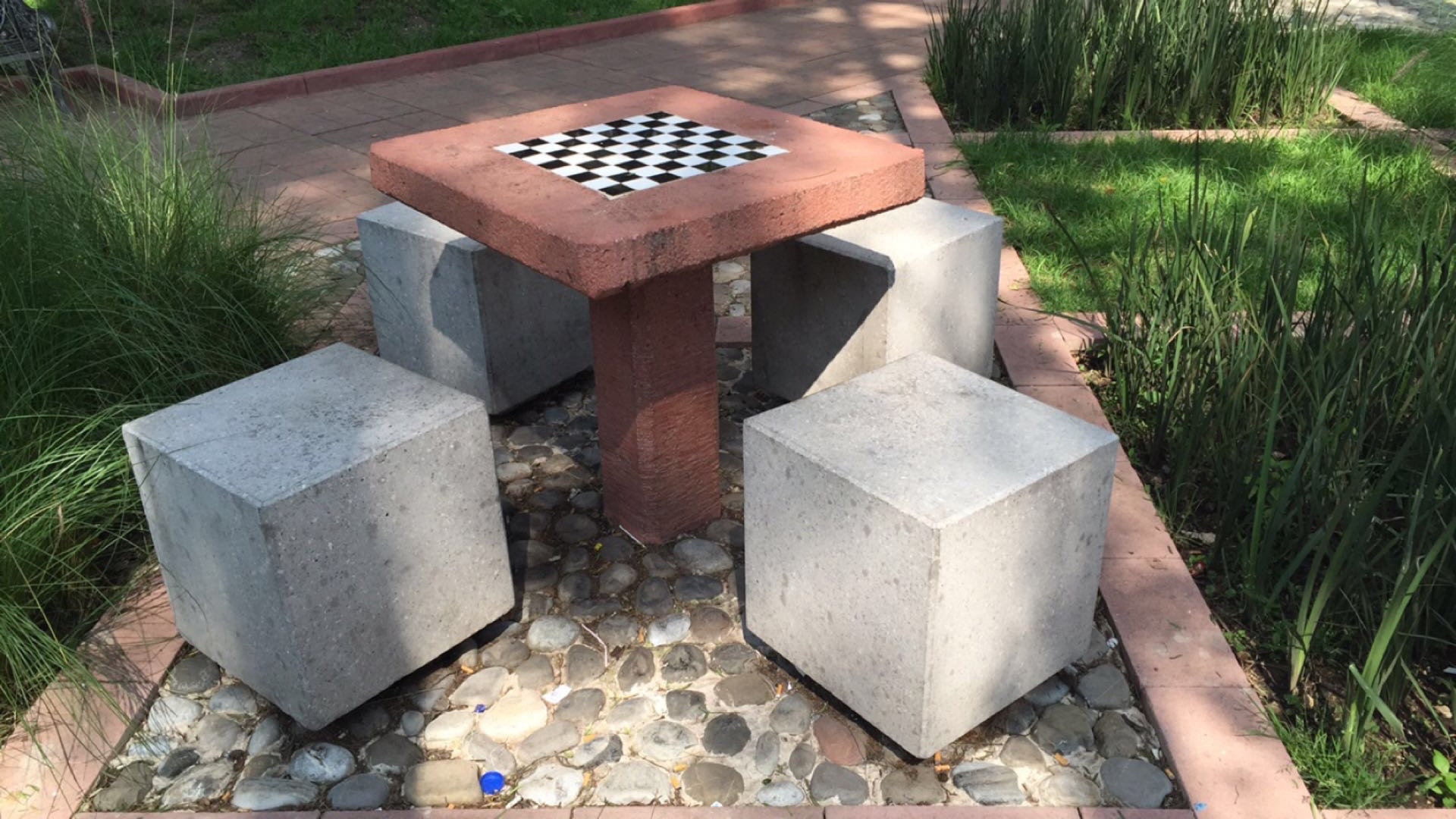

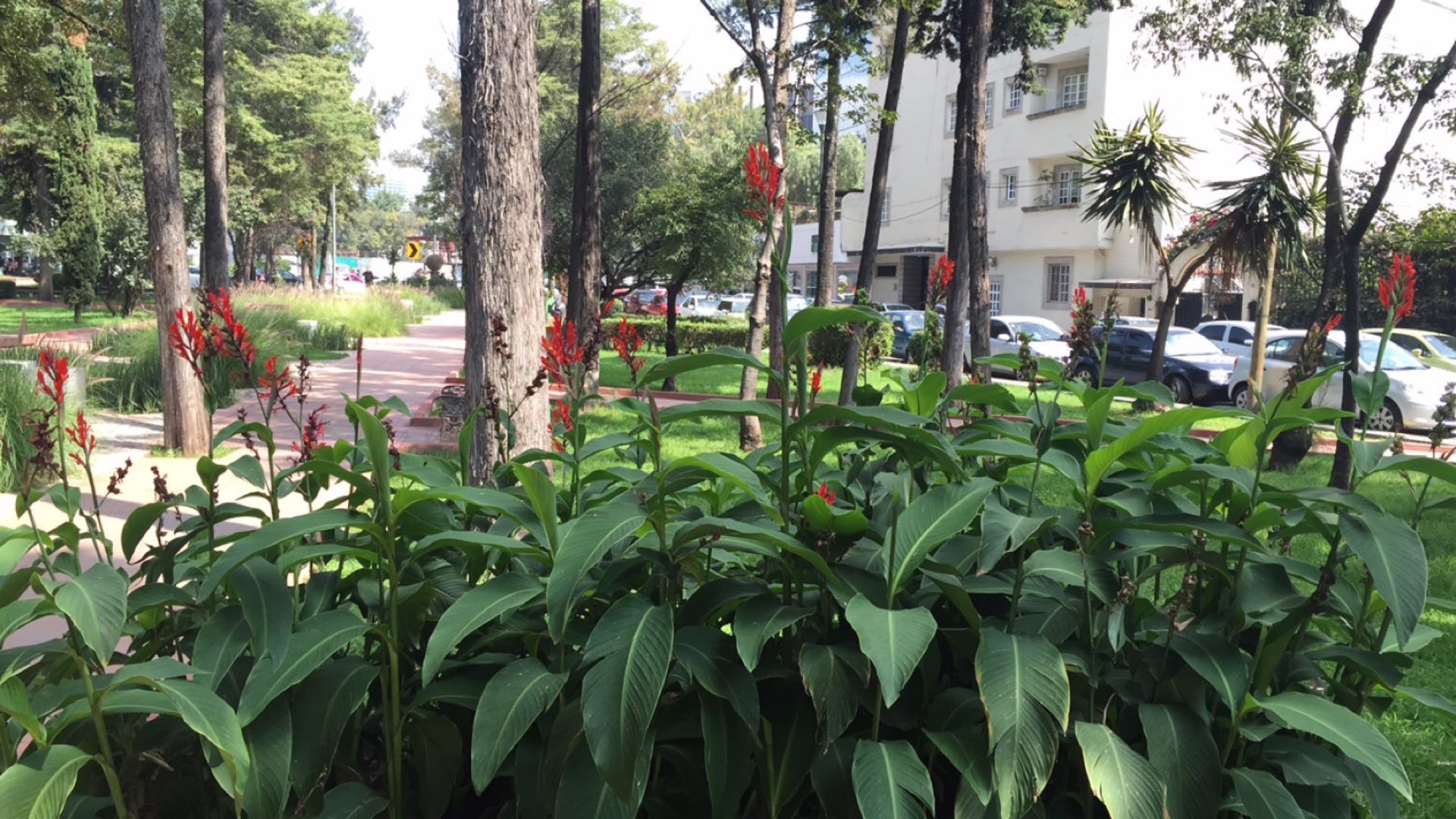

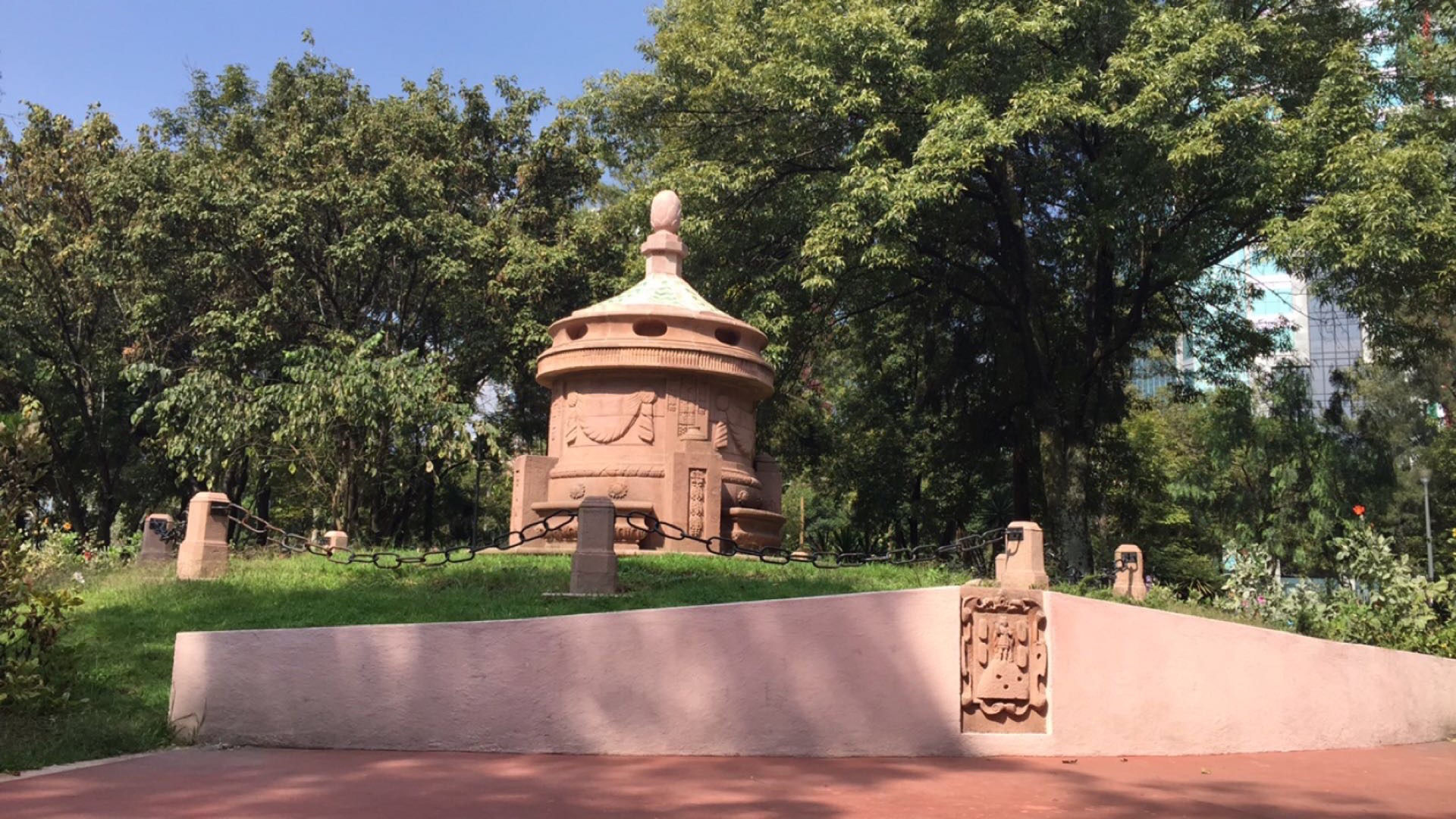

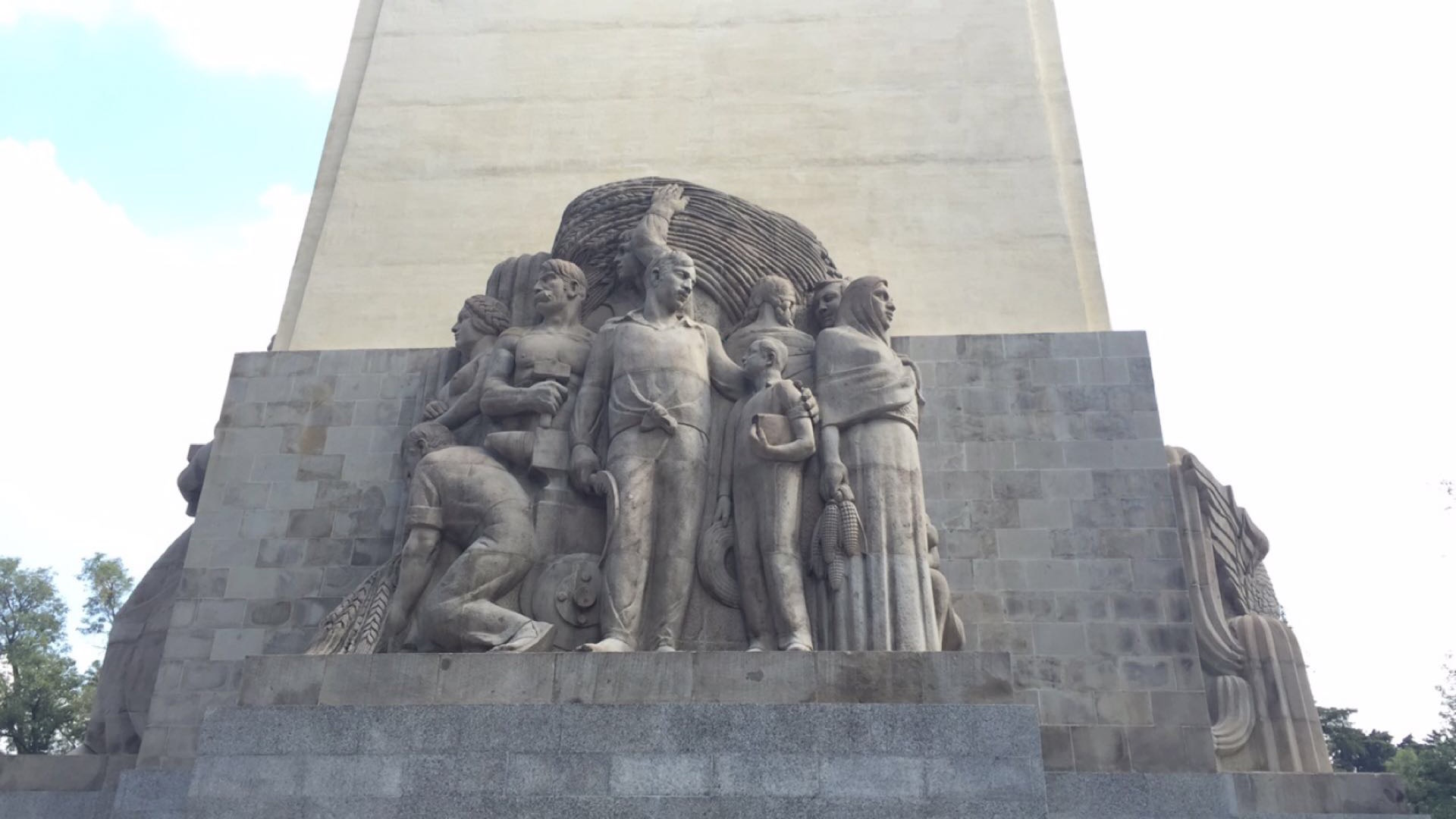

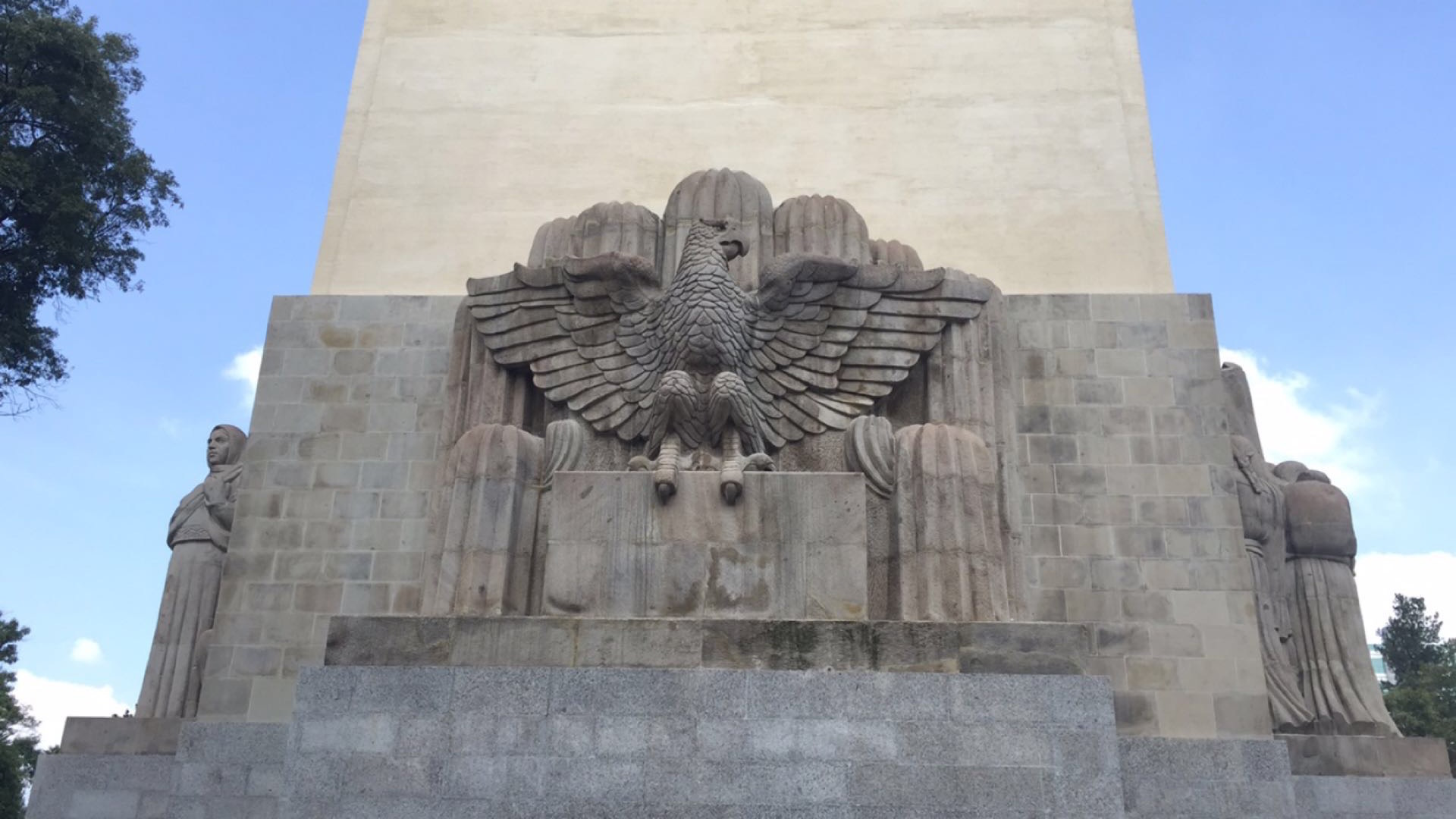

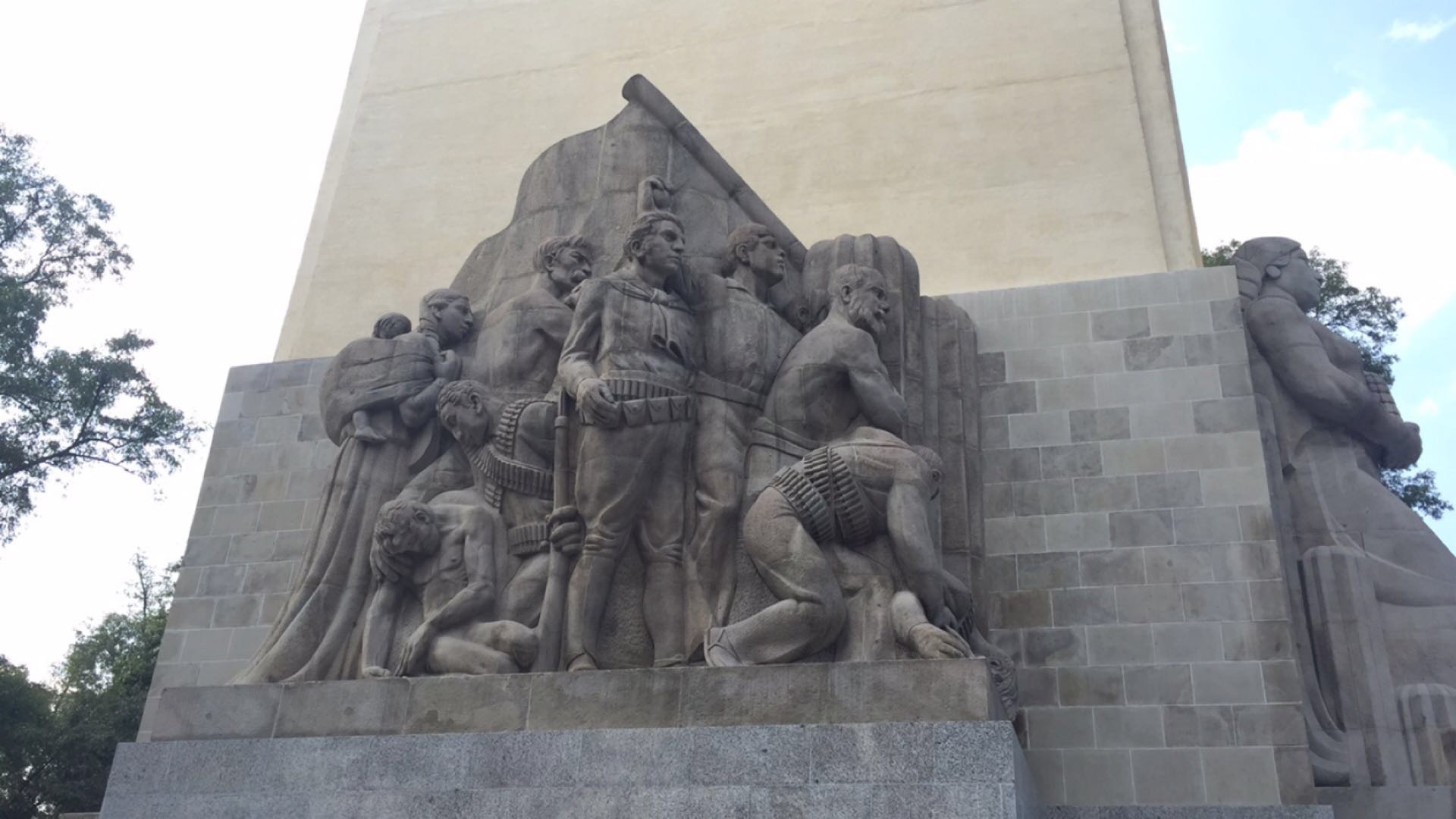

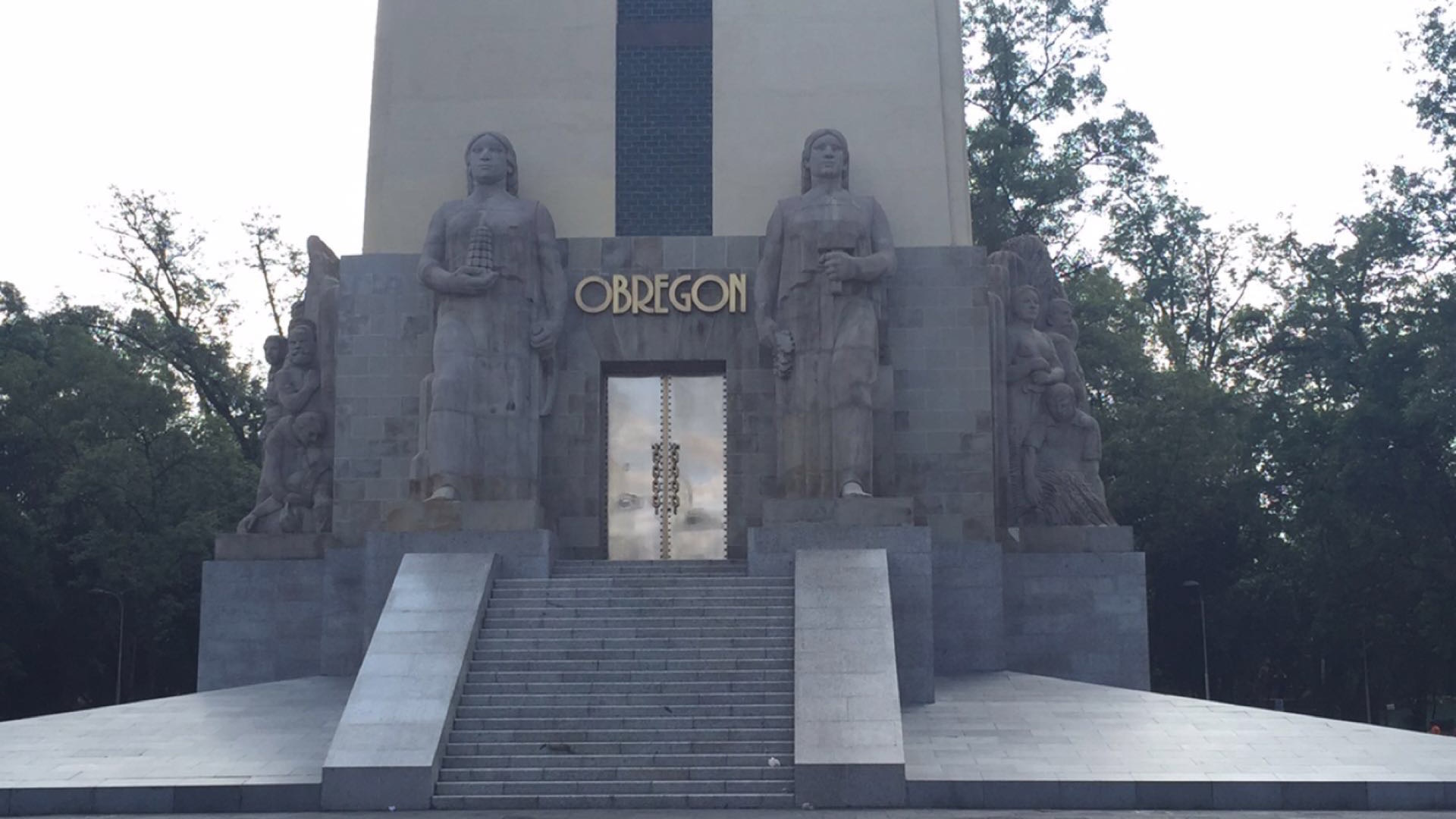

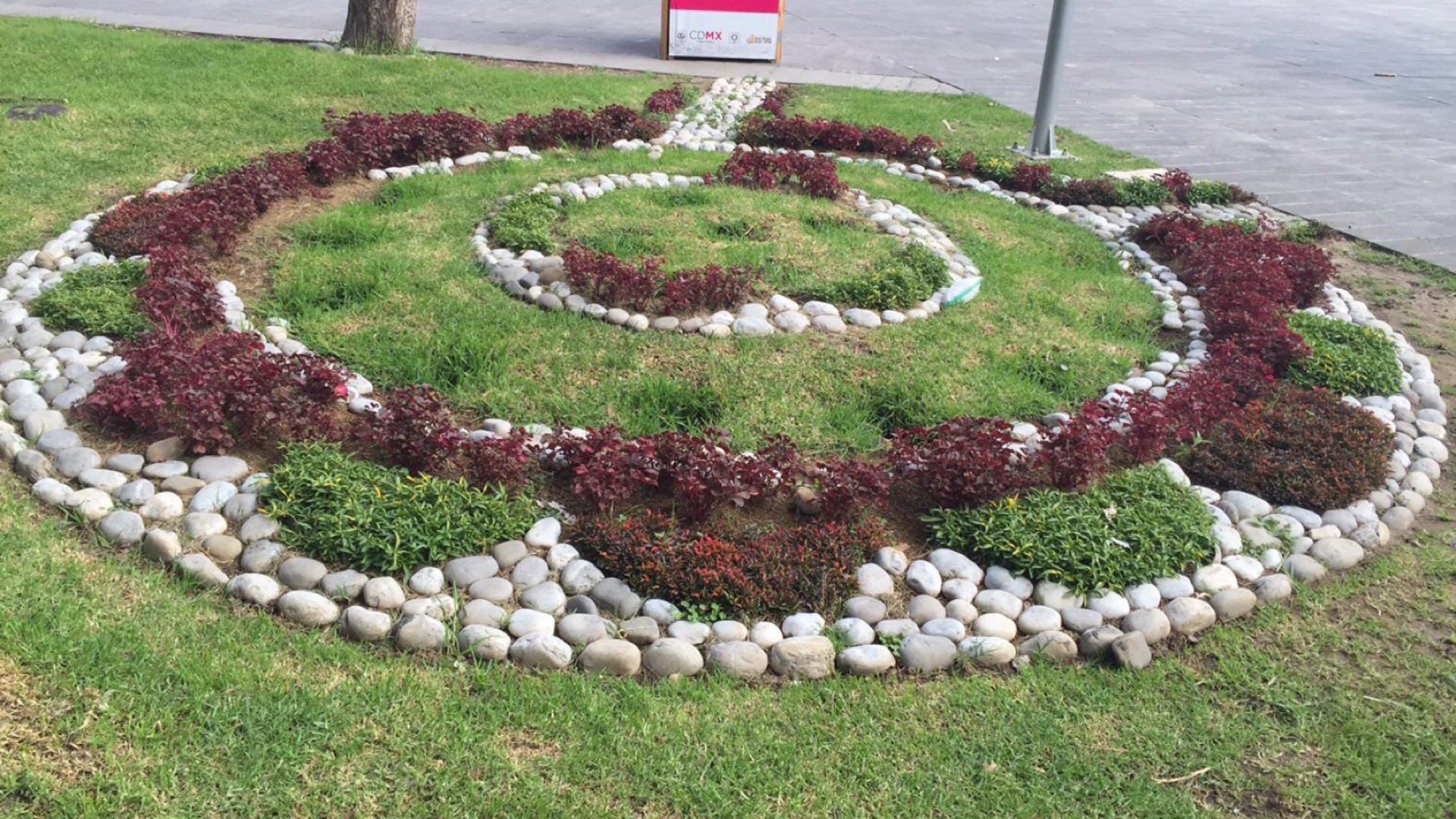

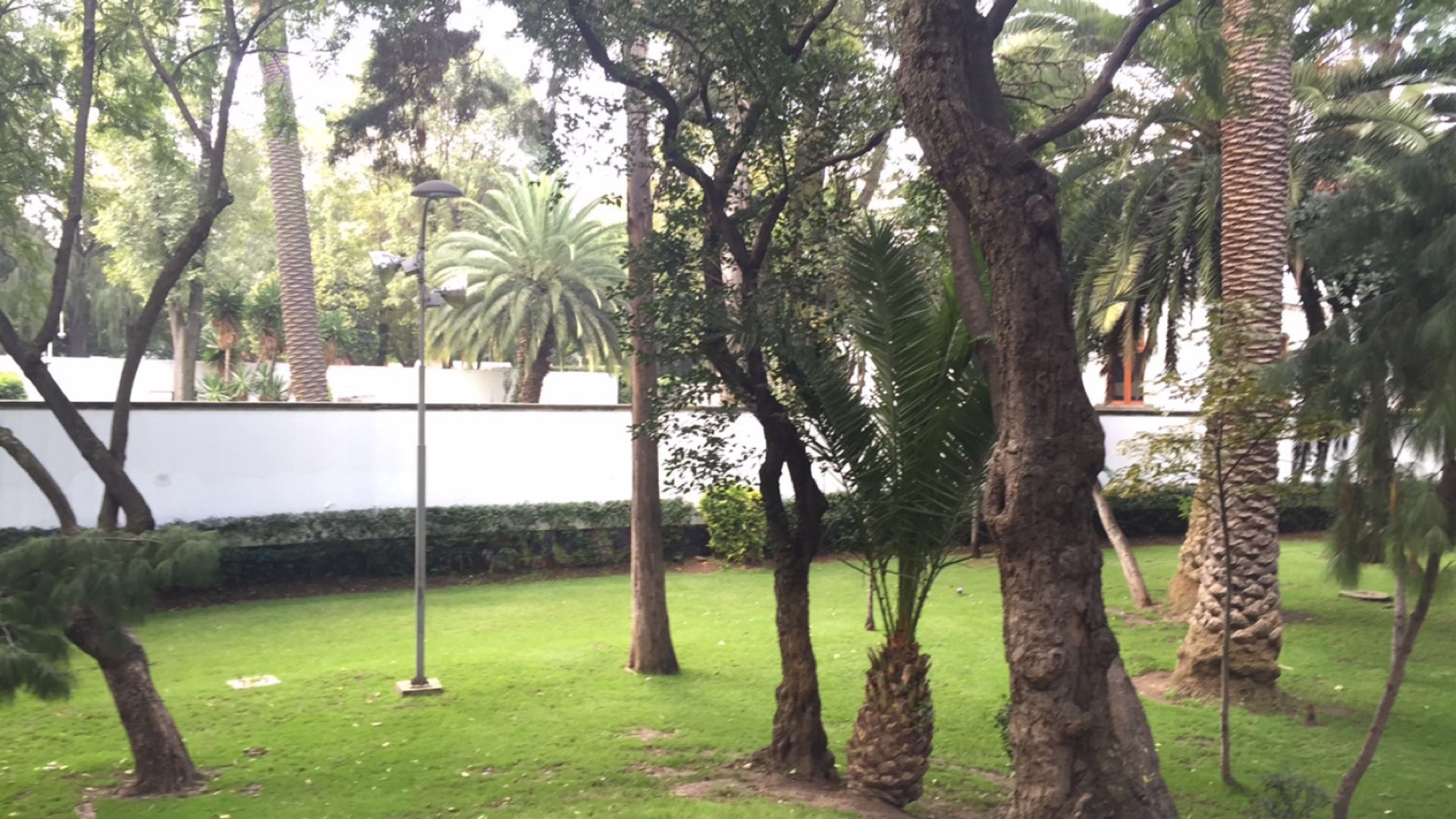

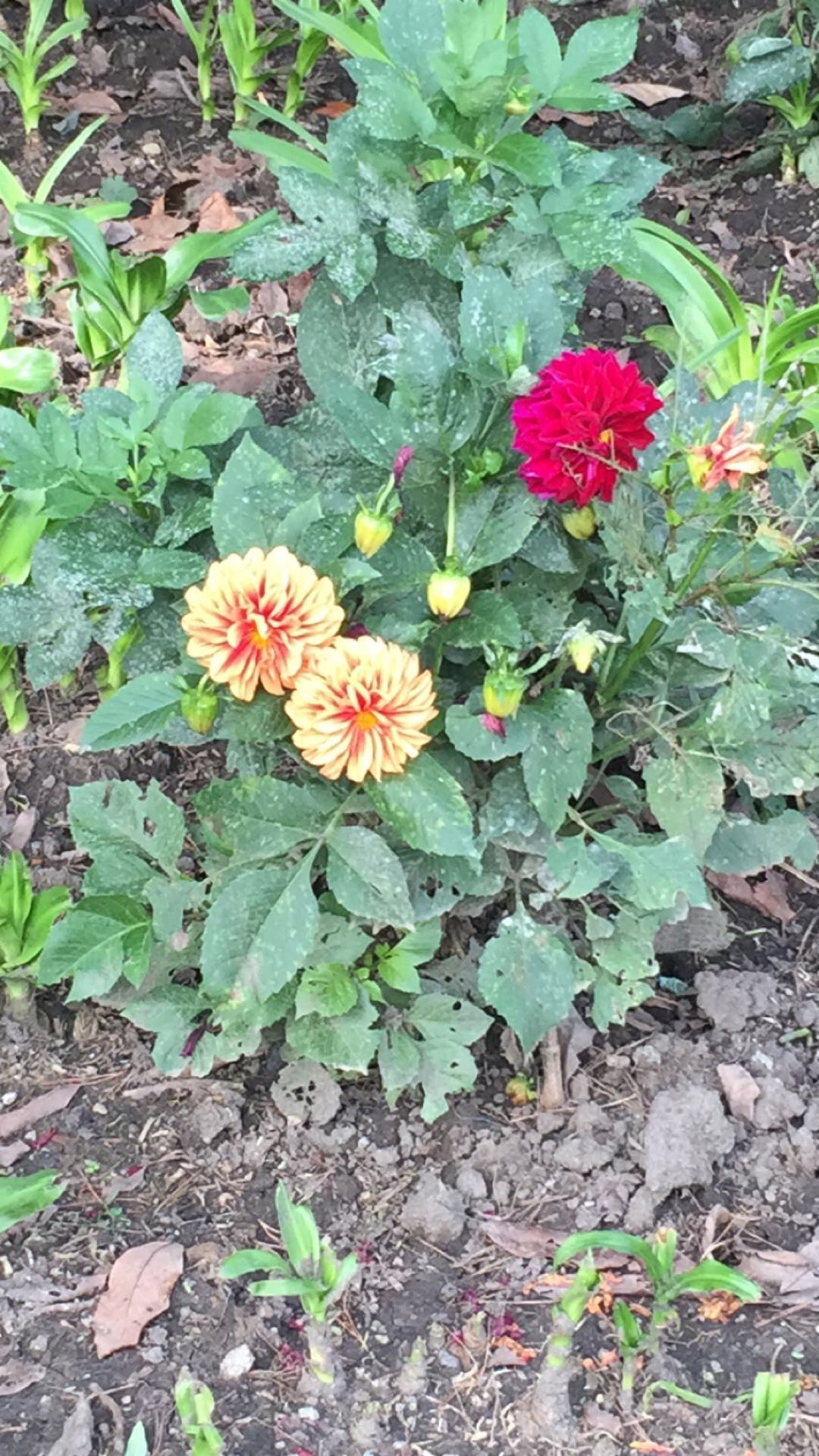

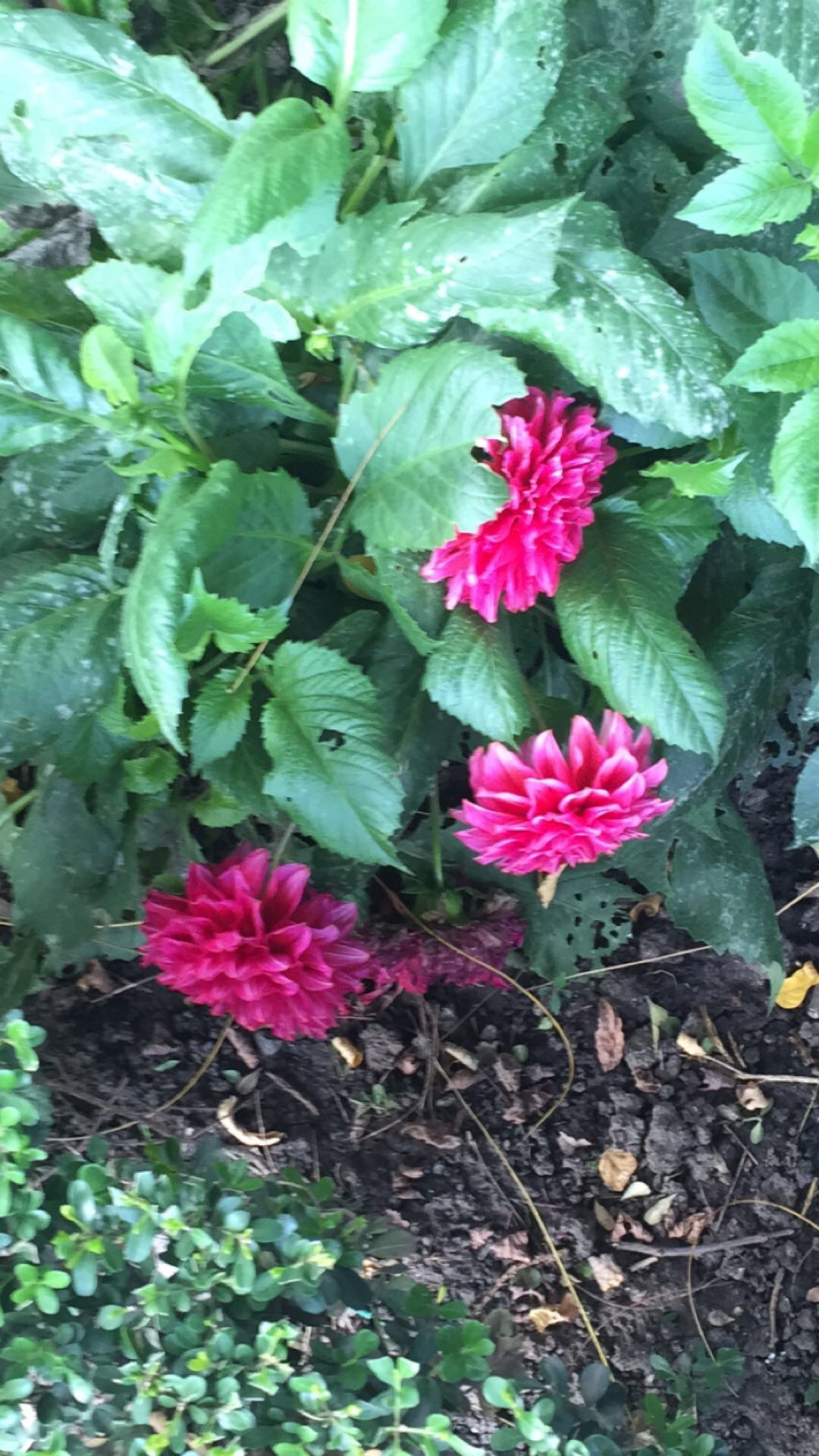
