= Conventionists =

Armed faction of the Mexican Revolution

Conventionist Army
- Ejército Convencionista
- Leaders: Pancho Villa, Emiliano Zapata
- Dates active: 1914–1917
- Merger of: División del Norte; Liberation Army of the South
- Split from: Constitutional Army
- Country: Revolutionary Mexico

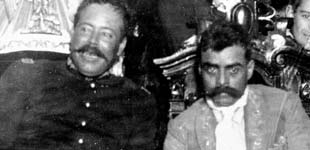
Pancho Villa (left) and Emiliano Zapata

The Conventionists were a faction led by Pancho Villa and Emiliano Zapata which grew in opposition to the Constitutionalists of Venustiano Carranza and Álvaro Obregón during the Mexican Revolution. It was named for the Convention of Aguascalientes of October to November 1914.

== Formation ==
Prior to the formation of the Constitutionalists and Conventionists, the two groups worked together to defeat General Victoriano Huerta. Huerta had overthrown President Francisco Madero and taken over the government in 1913. Opposition to Huerta was led by Venustiano Carranza, along with generals Pancho Villa and Álvaro Obregón. They were loosely allied with Emiliano Zapata. Together, they defeated Huerta in 1914. At the Convention of Aguascalientes in the fall of 1914, the winning revolutionary factions were unable to agree on the future direction of the country, and a civil war ensued between the Constitutionalists and Conventionists.

== Goals ==
The Conventionists called for more radical, immediate land reform, with which Carranza's Constitutionalists did not agree. They also wanted to implement the Plan of Ayala (1911), written by Emiliano Zapata, calling for the redistribution of land. In addition, Villa and Zapata wanted a decentralized federal government with more state autonomy. With this, the Conventionists garnered the support of the countryside.

== Participation in the civil war, and fall ==
At the start of the civil war, the Conventionists captured Mexico City in late 1914. There were approximately 150,000 soldiers in both factions in 1915. By spring of 1915, Obregón began to defeat the Conventionists. Zapata retreated to his home state, occasionally sending troops to Villa. Villa was defeated at the Battle of Celaya, followed by losses at León, Santa Ana, Aguascalientes, and Agua Prieta. By 1917, Carranza was elected president and the civil war was over. Guerilla skirmishes would continue separately by the armies of Zapata and Villa near their home states. In 1919, Zapata was killed by Carranza's government. Villa signed a peace treaty with Carranza's successor Adolfo de la Huerta in 1920, but died in an ambush three years later in 1923.
