= Convention of Aguascalientes =

Meeting that took place during the Mexican Revolution

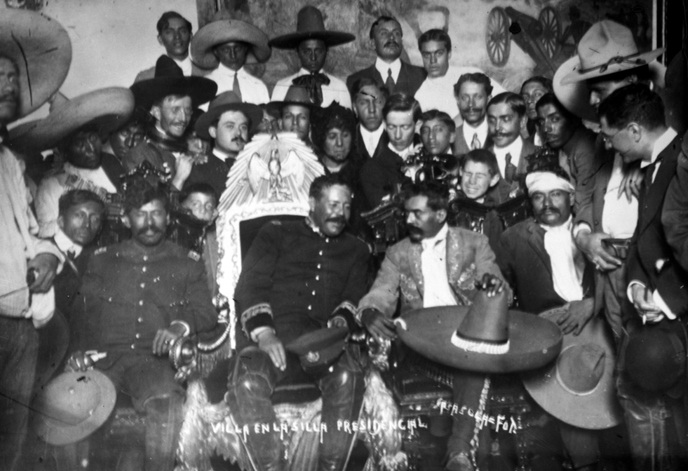
- Photograph of Pancho Villa seated in the presidential chair, together with Emiliano Zapata
- Native name: Soberana Convención Revolucionaria
- English name: Sovereign Revolutionary Convention
- Date: October 10 – November 9, 1914
- Venue: Chamber of Deputies, later Morelos Theatre
- Location: Aguascalientes
- Type: Convention
- Cause: Mexican Revolution
- Motive: Unity of revolutionary forces
- Organised by: Conventionists
- Participants: Villistas, Zapatistas
- Outcome: Election of Eulalio Gutiérrez as President of Mexico, formation of the Conventionist Army and beginning of the civil war with the Constitutionalists

The Convention of Aguascalientes was a major meeting that took place during the Mexican Revolution between the revolutionary factions that had defeated Victoriano Huerta's Federal Army and forced his resignation and exile in July 1914.

The call for the convention was issued on 1 October 1914 by Venustiano Carranza, head of the Constitutional Army, who described it as the Gran Convención de Jefes militares con mando de fuerzas y gobernadores de los Estados ("Great Convention of Commanding Military Chiefs and State Governors") and seen as "the last attempt to create unity among the revolutionaries".

Its first sessions were held in the Chamber of Deputies (Palacio Legislativo de Donceles) in Mexico City, but were later transferred to the city of Aguascalientes (hence its name), where it met from 10 October to 9 November 1914.

== Background ==
General Victoriano Huerta, who had usurped the presidency in a coup d'état in February 1913, resigned the office in July 1914 on account of revolutionary pressures, and fled the country. He was replaced by Venustiano Carranza, who wished to discuss his government's policies with the other revolutionary leaders, and thus called for the convention to take place. However, faced with the absence of the Zapatistas (who did not recognise Carranza's authority) and the refusal of Pancho Villa to attend a meeting in Mexico City, it was agreed to relocate the convention to Aguascalientes.

== Convention ==
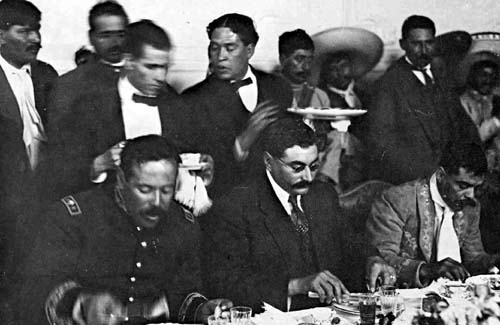
Villa (L), Gutiérrez (C), and Zapata (R), having dinner following their triumphant entry into Mexico City

The convention was intended to settle the differences between the "big four" warlords who played the biggest roles in overthrowing Huerta: Pancho Villa, Emiliano Zapata, Venustiano Carranza and Álvaro Obregón.

The various factions had to settle, in advance of the convention, the question of whether participants would only be revolutionary military men, or could include civilians as well. Carranza had a large and strong civilian backing, and argued for their inclusion, but lost.

Tensions were already high between Carranza and Villa, his former ally. Although initially Zapata had not openly sided with Villa, he was hostile to Carranza, with Carranza returning the feeling. According to Charles C. Cumberland, "The southerners had never liked Carranza and his pretensions, and Carranza despised the Zapatistas as ignorant, narrow-minded troublemakers."

From the onset, however, the convention was dominated by the Villistas, who imposed their points of view on the other delegates. Zapata's supporters did not arrive until 26 October (a delegation of 26, led by Paulino Martínez and Antonio Díaz Soto y Gama).

When the Convention first met on 10 October 1914, it declared itself sovereign, which meant that it was a deliberative assembly, not a consultative one. Carranza rejected the notion of sovereignty, and did not himself attend the convention or send representatives. Zapata had not yet arrived, and the delegates made the decision to not conclude any major business until he and his advisers were in attendance. Zapata arrived with an entourage of men with military titles, "but most of them [were] in fact civilians who had never led troops in any form".

There was a plan to merge revolutionary armies into a single military, which would have structurally taken the place of the Federal Army that ceased to exist with the fall of the Huerta regime. There was some support for this idea in theory, but the revolutionary armies had formed and fought under the command of particular leaders (such as Villa, Obregón, Zapata and Abraham González) and so in the current circumstances it was impossible to implement.

The convention elected General Eulalio Gutiérrez Ortiz as President of the Republic for a limited term of 20 days. It appointed Villa commander of the Conventionalist Army, which then took up arms against Carranza's Constitutionalist Army.

After the meeting, the newly reconciled Villa and Zapata entered Mexico City on 6 December, at the head of an army of 60,000 men. Carranza and his supporters consequently retreated to Veracruz. Subsequently, Zapata returned to his stronghold in Morelos, so that the alliance with Villa was largely in principle only.
