= 1935 Revolution Day Zócalo Battle =

Conflict in Zócalo, Mexico City

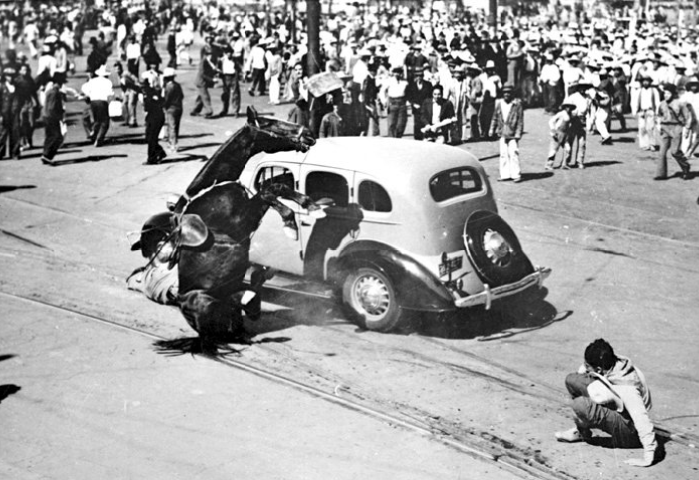
- Revolutionary Mexicanist Action cavalry being rammed by a car driven by a communist party member.
- Date: November 20, 1935
- Location: Zócalo, Mexico City, Mexico

Parties
| Revolutionary Mexicanist Action | Mexican Communist Party; United Front of Workers of the Steering Wheel; Proletarian Defense Committee; Various Trade Unions |

Lead figures
| Nicolás Rodríguez Carrasco (WIA) | Valentín Campa; David Alfaro Siqueiros; Rosendo Gómez Lorenzo |

Number
| ~170 | ~2,000–4,000 |

Casualties
- Deaths: 3
- Injuries: 46–50
- Arrested: 10 members Revolutionary Mexicanist Action; 20 workers
- Outcome: Committee created in Mexican Senate to ban the Revolutionary Mexicanist Action.

The 1935 Revolution Day Zócalo Battle was a violent conflict that broke out during the Revolution Day festival of 1935 at the Zócalo between members of the Revolutionary Mexicanist Action (Spanish: Acción Revolucionaria Mexicanista) and multiple organizations associated with the Mexican Communist Party. Members of the Revolutionary Mexicanist Action parading through the square were met by individuals associated with the Mexican Communist Party with the latter antagonizing the former. The brawl lasted about an hour and resulted in 46 to 50 injuries and 3 deaths. Among the wounded was Nicolás Rodríguez Carrasco, leader of the Revolutionary Mexicanist Action.

The deceased were Carlos Salinas Vela of the Communist Youth Federation of Mexico, Lucio Huerta, a worker, and José Trinidad García, a worker not affiliated with either organization.

Following the incident, intense political pressure was put on President Cárdenas to ban the Revolutionary Mexicanist Action organization. Cárdenas reached an agreement with the Mexican Senate to ban the organization 4 months later following another violent conflict between police and the organization in Monterrey.

== Background ==
Mass nationwide labor strikes had been occurring in Mexico the since the early 1930s. Labor movements and organizations had amassed a considerable amount of popular and political support. The Revolutionary Mexicanist Action, better known as the Gold Shirts, was a fascist far-right wing paramilitary founded in 1933. Composed primarily of ex-militaries and strikebreakers, the organization was financially supported by industrialists such as Eugenio Garza Sada and politically protected by Plutarco Elías Calles. The Gold Shirts were known for their violent union busting, anti-Semitic and anti-Chinese rhetoric, and extortion of students, workers, farmers, as well as smaller industrialists. By early 1935, the group had garnered a negative reputation among the general public. Multiple labor organizations consistently held rallies calling for politicians to have the organization dissolved. Coupled with the increasing amount of labor strikes, violent clashes between the Gold Shirts and labor organizations had been increasing in frequency in the months leading to the riot.

=== 1935 ===
On March 2, 1935, 100 members of Revolutionary Mexicanist Action, led by Ovidio Pedrero Valenzuela and Roque González Garza on horseback, raided a communist rally held by Hernán Laborde. The Gold Shirts raided the Mexican Communist Party's newly established headquarters in central Mexico City, attacked members of the party, burned books and archives, communist propaganda, and furniture inside the building. Among the injured included prominent members: Carlos Sánchez Cárdenas, Enrique Ramírez y Ramírez, José Fuster, Dolores Gómez and Jesús Lemus.

The incident was widely condemned across the country. In the following weeks, several demonstrations and protests were held by trade union organizations and leftist figures calling for the dissolution of the Gold Shirts. Many of these demonstrations often broke out in physical fights between the two groups including a shoot out on August 19 between the Gold Shirts and workers in Tizapan, Álvaro Obregón.

The Mexican delegation to the Seventh World Congress of the Comintern drafted a letter proposing a platform in which included the dissolution of the Revolutionary Mexicanist Action paramilitary. The letter also called for the expulsion of supporters of Elías Calles from the government.

== Revolution Day ==
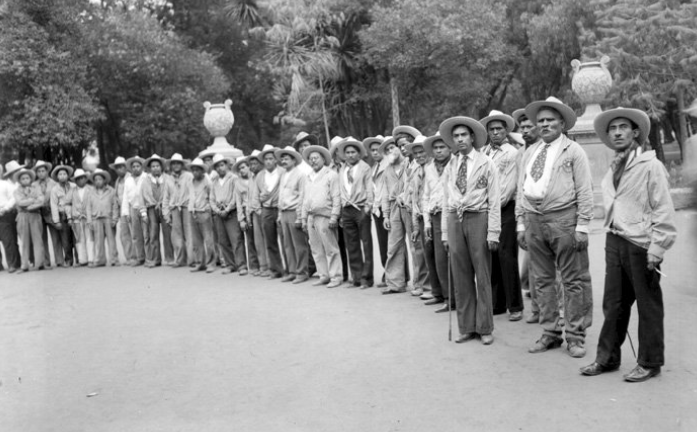
Gold Shirts in the Alameda Central, dated November 20, 1935

=== Planning ===
On November 19, Rodríguez Carrasco announced the Revolutionary Mexicanist Action was to participate in the Revolution Day festival. Rodríguez Carrasco stated the group was to parade and march in front of the National Palace in a display of power against President Cárdenas. This announcement sparked widespread displeasure among pro-labor organizations, which constituted a large portion of the festival. The Proletarian Defense Committee, which consisted of several leftist labor union organizations, campaigned against the ARM's participation, citing the organization's violent anti-labor activities and a potential conflict. The committee initiated several negotiations with federal and local authorities in opposition to the Revolutionary Mexicanist Action's attendance and even called upon authorities to have the parade cancelled altogether.

In secret, Valentín Campa was commissioned by the Political Bureau of the Central Committee of the PCM to orchestrate an attack on the Revolutionary Mexicanist Action and assassinate Rodríguez Carrasco.

=== Parade and clash ===
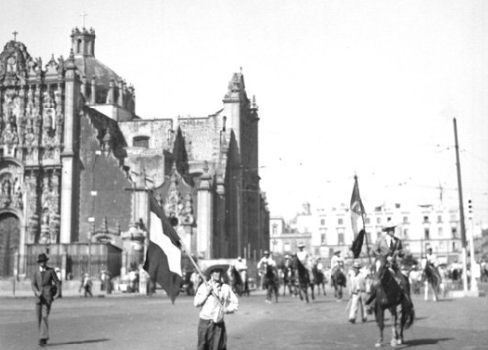
Gold Shirts marching before the conflict, in front of the Mexico City Cathedral's Metropolitan Tabernacle

The Revolution Day parade went on as planned with many organizations participating at the Zócalo. On the central balcony of the National Palace stood President Lázaro Cárdenas's secretary, Luis I. Rodríguez, who was overlooking the celebration on the president's behalf. Directly below the balcony were thirty parked cars serving as improvised tribunes for the Communist Party's more radical figures, among which was painter David Alfaro Siqueiros. The cars were manned by members of the United Front of Workers of the Steering Wheel.

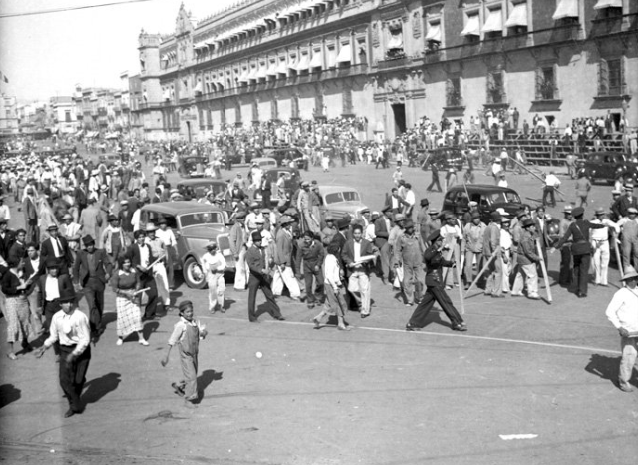
Revolutionary Mexicanist Action and workers fighting in front of the palace. Also pictured are the United Front of Workers of the Steering Wheel in front of the National Palace

With the strength of about seventy-five horsemen and one hundred men on foot, the Revolutionary Mexicanist Action marched through the esplanade. The group was organized militarily, marching in formation led by Rodriguez Carrasco. All members were dressed in gold shirts and wore sombreros, carrying flags and banners. The group handed out pamphlets with prerequisites for those interested in joining the organization.

At approximately 2:00 PM, Siqueiros, who had been giving a speech, shouted from afar to Rodríguez Carrasco that the Gold Shirts were forbidden to pass. Rodríguez Carrasco then gave instructions to the Gold Shirts not to approach the crowd. However, the situation quickly escalated as the temperament of both parties deteriorated.

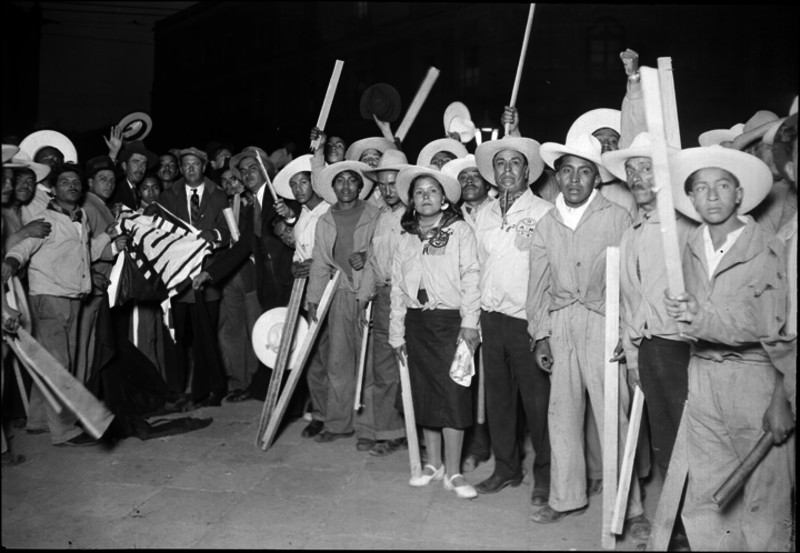
Gold Shirts holding wooden beams after the fight.

As planned by Campa, a group of young communists confronted the cavalry and threw small fireworks at the horses' legs. The horsemen responded by whipping the youth with their lassos. A small fleet of cars manned by communist drivers, which had organized in secret, rammed into the horses in a rapid flanking movement. Several horses and their riders, including Rodríguez Carrasco, rolled across the pavement and were incapacitated. At this moment, the groups began brawling using wooden beams torn from bleachers, stones, and pistols. Wide-scale brawls lasted for about an hour before the police intervened.

In his memoir, Campa states that Rodríguez Carrasco was specifically targeted. After Rodríguez Carrasco was knocked down from his horse, he quickly left the area. An unnamed PCM member observed and followed him to the corner of Calle de República de Argentina and Guatemala. where he stabbed Rodríguez Carrasco in the abdomen with a dagger. Rodríguez Carrasco was left critically wounded and was attended by a medic of the Red Cross.

== Aftermath ==
The following day, El Universal reported 50 injured and 3 killed while El Nacional reported a total of 47 injured and 2 killed. Among the injured was ARM leader Rodriguez Carrasco.

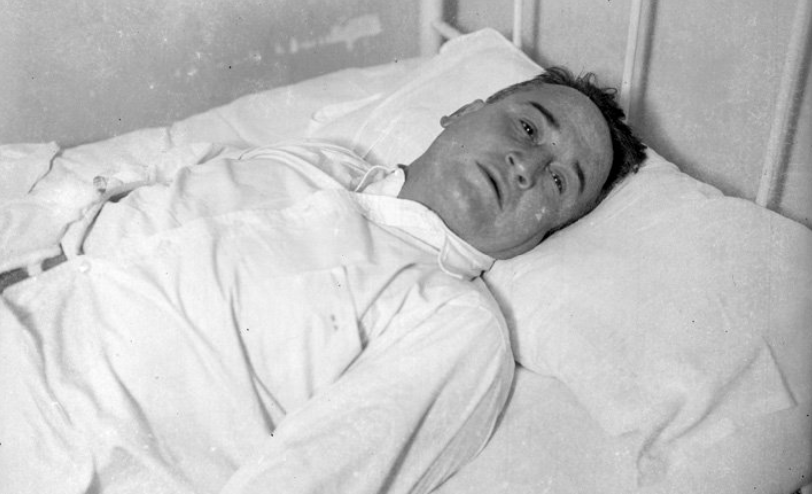
Rodriguez Carrasco receiving medical attention, dated November 20, 1935

8 Gold Shirt members and 20 workers were arrested immediately after the clash. In the following 3 days, police announced the arrest of 10 members of the Revolutionary Mexicanist Action who attended the parade while in the possession of illegal weapons.

A funeral for Carlos Salinas Vela and José Trinidad García was held on November 24 and attended by over 15,000 people associated with various labor organizations.

=== Reactions ===
On December 1, the National Union of Veterans of the Revolution published a letter to the Senate in where they opposed the dissolution of the ARM, stating the Gold Shirts had acted in self defense against the communist instigators.

In early December, the International Red Aid asked President Cárdenas to ban the organization. The group cited the attacks, extortion, on individual rights and various religious organizations that included Jewish businessmen.

=== Political ===
On November 22, senators Ernesto Soto Reyes and Guillermo Flores Muñoz condemned the Gold Shirts for the incident and called for a formation of a commission to ban the group. In his speech, Soto Reyes state the organization was composed of "irresponsible straw-men" and called into question their legitimacy. He asserted the organization did not represent any union or worker's interests and therefore did not contravene any legal statue by requesting its prohibition.

By February 1936, a considerable amount of pressure was put onto President Cárdenas to ban the Revolutionary Mexicanist Action. This followed an incident where the Gold Shirts engaged in a gun battle with police during an anti-communist demonstration in Monterrey. On February 27, 1936, President Cárdenas decreed that the Revolutionary Mexicanist Action was illegal.
