= Calle de República de Argentina =

Street in Mexico City

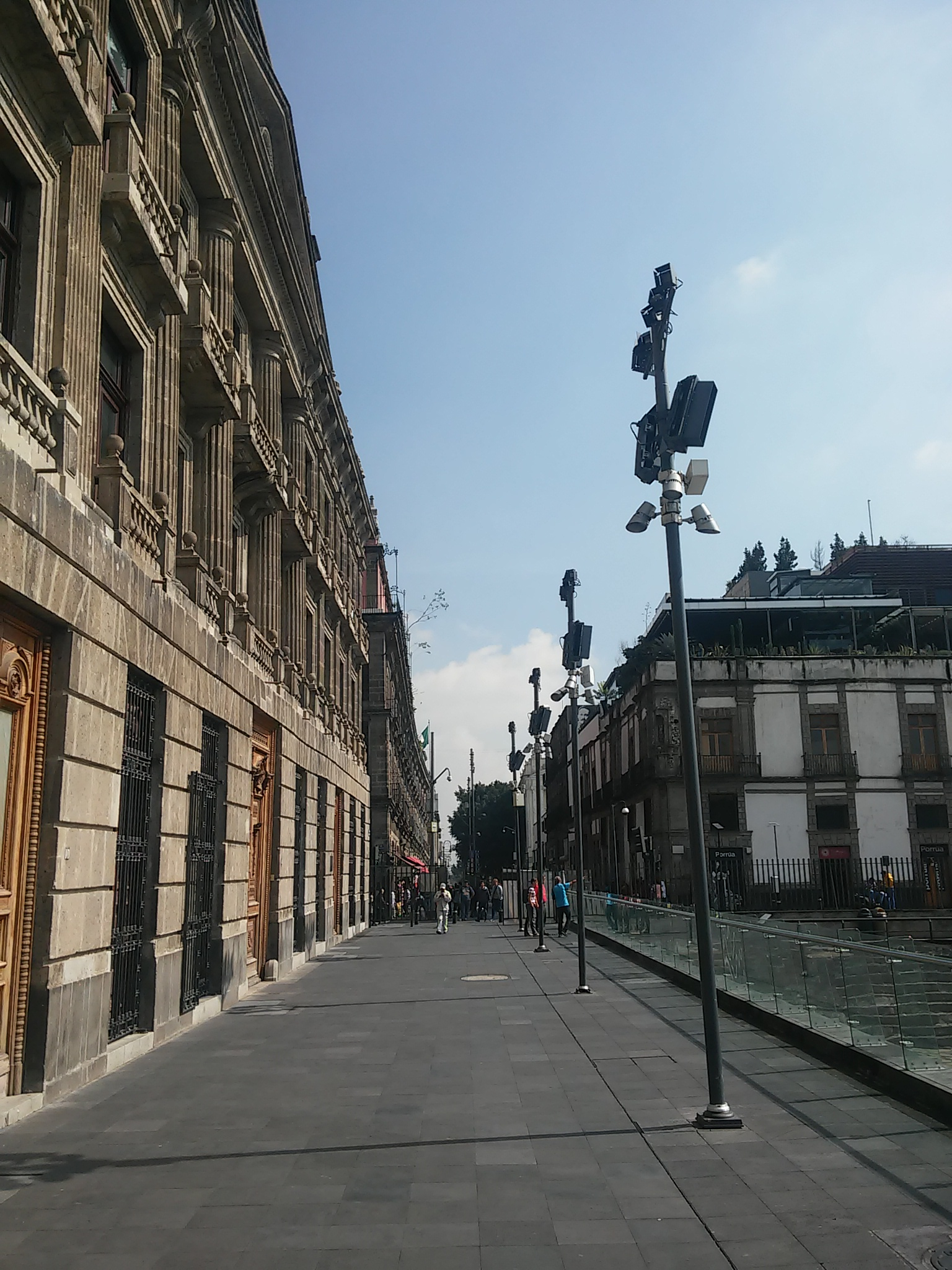
- View of Calle de República de Argentina to the north.
- Length: 927 m (3,041 ft)
- Width: 7.5 m (25 ft)
- Location: Mexico City, Mexico
- Nearest metro station: Lagunilla

Calle de República de Argentina is a street located in the historic center of Mexico City. It is named after the country of Argentina, a name it received in 1921.

It runs from south to north from the archaeological zone of Templo Mayor, Plaza Manuel Gamio and Calle de República de Guatemala to Eje 1 Norte, where it takes the name of Jesús Carranza to the north. Its origin dates back to the first trace of Mexico City made by Alonso García Bravo in 1522 from the path of Calzada de Tepeyacac and had the name of Calle del Relox or Del Reloj for several centuries, due to a mechanical clock installed in the Real Audiencia building in the 16th century.
