= Red Shirts (Mexico) =

Far-left Mexican paramilitary group

Red Shirts Camisas Rojas
- Leader: Tomás Garrido Canabal
- Founded: 1931
- Dissolved: 1935
- Headquarters: Tabasco, Mexico
- Ideology: Communism; Marxism; Leninism; Anti-clericalism; Fascism (accused)
- Political position: Far-left
- Colors: Black and red
- Anthem: The Internationale

Party flag
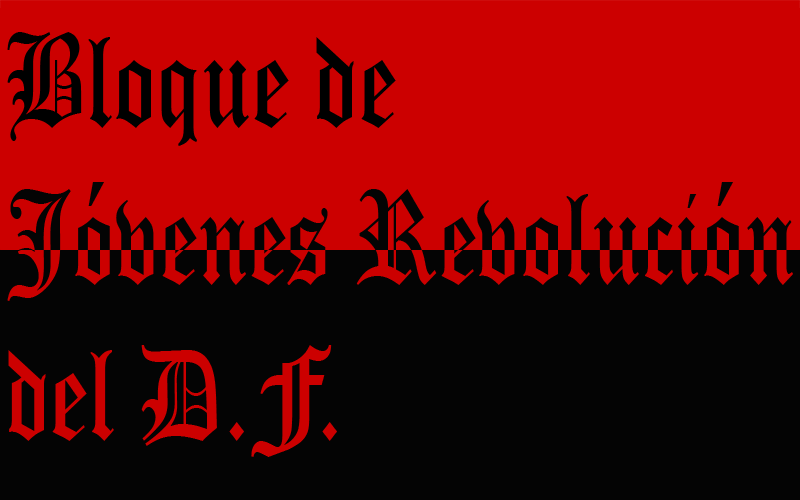

The Red Shirts (Spanish: Camisas Rojas) were a paramilitary organization, existing in the 1930s, founded by the atheist and anti-Catholic anticlerical Governor of Tabasco, Mexico, Tomás Garrido Canabal, during his second term. During the ongoing conflict over the anticlerical articles of the 1917 constitution, they systematically destroyed church buildings. The group, created to carry out the governor's orders, takes its name from its uniform of red shirts, black pants, and black and red military caps. It consisted of men and women aged 15 to 30.

== History ==
Apart from religion, the Red Shirts also attacked other things they considered detrimental to progress, most notably alcohol. They have been described as "fascist"; however, the anthem of the Red Shirts was the Internationale, widely considered to be the socialist anthem, and Garrido named one of his sons after Vladimir Lenin, a Marxist and also considered himself a Marxist Bolshevik.

Some scholars have argued that Garrido's authoritarian policies were more akin to European right-wing dictatorships, though he wished to turn the traditionally conservative state of Tabasco into a socialist model and fought for socialist causes. Tabasco has been called a "socialist tyranny" by Martin C. Needler, Dean of the School of International Studies at the University of the Pacific in California. Garrido also invited the First Congress of Socialist Students to meet in the state of Tabasco and created a form of socialist education which he termed "Rationalist". The Red Shirts have been described as "shock troops of indoctrination for the intense campaign against 'God and religion.'" The Red Shirts were also used against the Cristeros revolt, an uprising against the persecution of Catholics by the government of Plutarco Elías Calles. The Red Shirts practiced socialist marriages, and two Red Shirt members, José Correa and Victoria Ley, pronounced their own vows:

Before society, before Comrade Tomas Garrido Canabal, and all present, we declare that we have united in matrimony by our express will

And another two members sent out invitations:

J. Felix Gutierrez and Amalia Gonzalez have the honor to invite you to the civil and socialist matrimonial act, to take place at 21 o' clock the 17th of this month at 305 Gomez Farias Street. Please honor us...

In 1934 Garrido was named secretary of Agriculture by the new president Lázaro Cárdenas, hoping to contain the Red Shirts that way. However, Garrido took the Red Shirts with him to Mexico City at the National Autonomous University of Mexico to intervene in student politics.

== Attacks ==
On December 30, 1934, approximately sixty Red Shirts from Tabasco, who had been organizing anti-religious demonstrations including the questioning of God's existence, were involved in a confrontation outside of San Juan Bautista church in Mexico City that killed five Catholics who were shot, and one red shirt was beaten to death by the crowd. The Cárdenas government later arrested 62 red shirts for involvement in the attack, along with three Catholics for the lynching of the red shirt.

In 1935, after he ordered his Red Shirts to kill Catholic activists in Mexico City who were seeking to return to Tabasco, Garrido was forced to step down and into exile in Costa Rica. His paramilitary groups, including the Camisas Rojas, were subsequently disbanded.

== Media ==
The Red Shirts hunt for a priest from Concepción, Tabasco, in Graham Greene's 1940 novel The Power and the Glory.

== See also ==
- Gold Shirts
- The Lawless Roads

=== General ===
- Gun politics in Mexico
