= Revolutionary Mexicanist Action =

Mexican fascist organization

Revolutionary Mexicanist Action Acción Revolucionaria Mexicanista
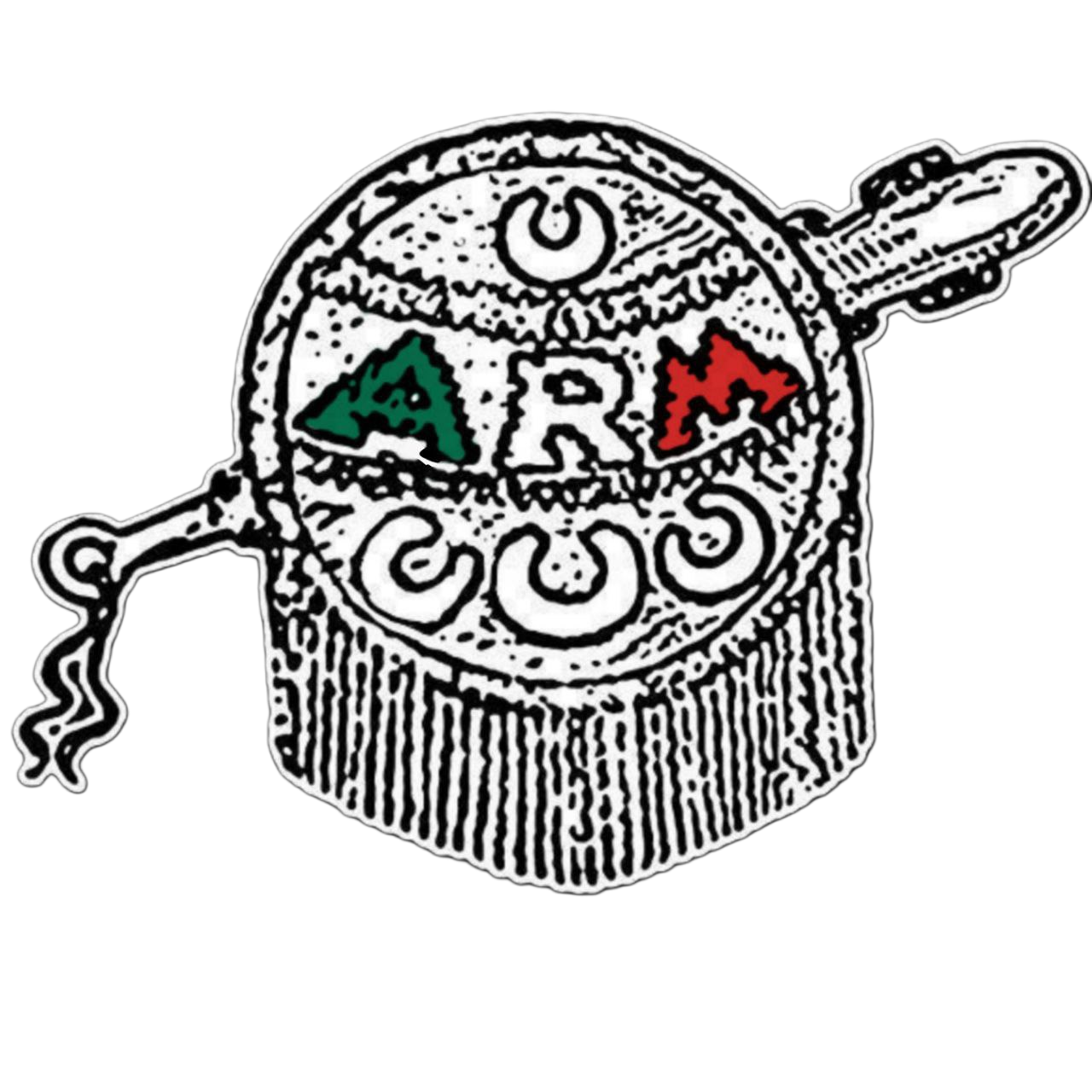
- Abbreviation: ARM
- Founder: Nicolás Rodríguez Carrasco
- Founded: 1934; 92 years ago
- Banned: 1936; 90 years ago
- Membership: approx. 60,000 (1936 est.)
- Ideology: Fascism (Mexico); Mexican ultra-nationalism
- Political position: Far-right
- Colours: Gold (official)
- Slogan: "Mexico for Mexicans"

The Revolutionary Mexicanist Action (Spanish: Acción Revolucionaria Mexicanista), better known as the Gold Shirts (Camisas Doradas), was a Mexican fascist, secular, antisemitic, anti-communist, ultra-nationalist paramilitary organization, originated on March 10, 1934, in Mexico City and operated until disbanded in 1936. With ultra-nationalist, strikebreaking roots and Nazi German support, the organization sought to expel Chinese, Jews, and communists from Mexico. The organization often violently engaged with labor movements associated with the Mexican Communist Party and with labor strikers.

Its members were known as the Golden Shirts because most of them were veteran soldiers of Pancho Villa, who referred to his soldiers this way because of the uniform they wore. The term 'Golden Shirts' was never used by the organization, as it was a nickname used by both supporters and detractors of the ARM. However, they did use the term 'Los Dorados' in propaganda and official documents.

Nicolás Rodríguez Carrasco, a brigadier general under Pancho Villa in the 1910s during the Mexican Revolution, led the group during its most active period. Many founding members of the paramilitary had also been veterans of the Mexican Revolution of 1910–1920. Members were known as "the Gold Shirts", a name reminiscent of Villa's elite soldiers whom he referred to as "los dorados" (the golden ones).

Operating under the motto of "Mexico for Mexicans", the organization called for the expulsion of Jews and Chinese from Mexico. The Gold Shirts advocated the seizure of Chinese- and Jewish-owned businesses. They also fiercely opposed labor movements and often clashed with members of the Mexican Communist Party. The group was very active in union busting, with the Gold Shirts instigating violent clashes with strikers.

The organization received financial support from the Nazi Party of Nazi Germany, as well as from the National Fascist Party of Italy, and from Mexican industrialists such as Eugenio Garza Sada (1892–1973). The Gold Shirts also received political protection from ex-president Plutarco Elías Calles (in office from 1924 to 1928), who vehemently opposed the Cárdenas government (in office from 1934 to 1940).

The true fascists of Mexico are the Gold Shirts, they took the fight against communism and the Jews as their flag.

— Heinrich Rüdt von Collenberg, ambassador of the Third Reich in Mexico

== Description of clothing and salute ==
Members of the ARM wear bright golden ranch-style shirts, tied at the waist, with black pants and a palm hat. They wear a red bandana around the neck. On the yellow shirt, there is an embroidered shield of Aztec inspiration called Yaoyotl. Its deeper meaning consists of four half-moons and cotton (Ichcatl) representing agriculture. The Chimalli (shield) is made of tiger (jaguar) skin, and the half-moons are gold. The fringes are made of quetzal feather beards, twisted with gold thread. A central band with the letters A.R.M., in the colors of our flag, represents the Dorados' program. The shield of Moctecuhzoma II, the most notable and powerful lord of Pre-Columbian America, from Tenochtitlan to Nicaragua, was the Chimalli with gold half-moons, all decorated with symbols of the god of war.

Their organization is divided into branches like infantry and cavalry, and they are supported by a female nursing corps. Many people wonder if this is a brotherhood, a kind of club, or just a ridiculous eccentricity, but there is no doubt that we are dealing with a fascist organization, like those that have recently appeared in Italy and Germany. The very name "camisas doradas" (golden shirts) is akin to the blackshirts and brownshirts of those countries. Furthermore, like their counterparts, they employ the tactic of inspiring fear and respect by their mere presence, exhibit an aggressive, crude nationalism, and openly confess anti-communism, constantly resorting to the use of force. Let's hope the authorities closely monitor the activities of this organization, which mimics the attitudes of Mussolini's fasci di combattimento or Hitler's stormtroopers. "The salute with the right arm, raised with a clenched fist, is the ancient Aztec victory salute." Unlike other fascist organizations in the world, the ARM found a salute that characterizes the organization and differentiates it from other parties. This salute was found in ancient culture, which at the time was looked down upon by many Mexicans. The Dorados gave it their own meaning, infused it with mysticism, and it became the "Call to victory, the call to action to save Mexico, the war salute par excellence." This battle pose can be found in various contemporary representations as well as in ancient codices. Even the Huitzilopochtli (god of war) is depicted raising his arm with his Xiuhcoatl. On some occasions, the uniformed members used a type of club, resembling a macahuitl/mace. This Dorados salute consisted of two steps: first, the hand was placed on the "Yaoyotl" shield, and then the right hand was raised with a clenched fist.

== History ==
=== Background (1920s–1933) ===
==== Anti-Chinese and antisemitic sentiment ====
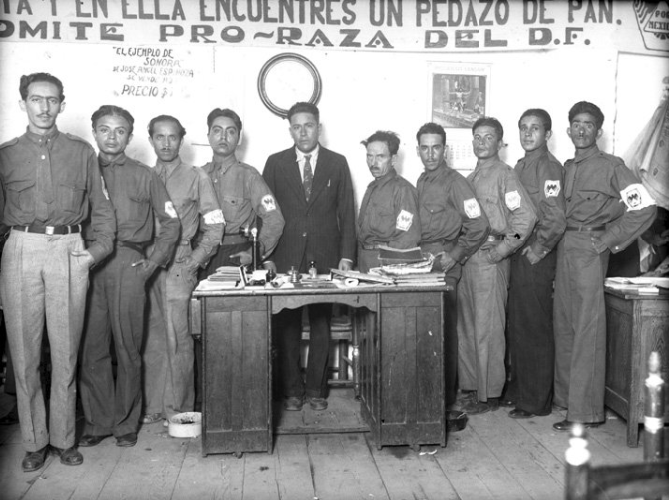
Mexico City Pro-Race Committee meeting in 1930

At the start of the 1920s, racism in Mexico and xenophobic sentiments begun to intensify. Organizations such as the Pro-Race Committee and the Anti-Chinese and Anti-Jewish Nationalist League were created in response to a large influx of immigrants to Mexico. This was a result of growing economic concerns among the Mexican working and middle class. As Chinese-Mexicans, and Jews to a lesser extent, had come to constitute a considerable portion of the merchant class, many protests and boycotts against Chinese businesses were held. Mexican labor unions had put political pressure to restrict Chinese and Jewish immigration to Mexico.

The Mexican government, both state and federal, actively enacted and enforced discriminatory laws targeting people of Chinese descent. Following the Great Depression, Jews had become subject to the same type of persecution. Notably in May 1931 where 250 Jewish merchants were expelled from the La Lagunilla Market in Mexico City.

==== 1930s labor strikes ====
The government of President Pascual Ortiz Rubio faced intense political instability, exacerbated by the Great Depression. Droughts and floods heavily impeded agricultural production. By 1932, mass labor strikes in multiple industries were erupting throughout the country.

Plutarco Elías Calles wished to "keep workers under control" in response to the support Vicente Lombardo Toledano had been garnering among laborers. Ortiz Rubio would resign from the presidency in September 1932 as a result of Calles's influence and power in the government.

==== Green Shirts (1932) ====
As the result of labor strikes and the support Toledano had garnered, Calles wished to protect the business interests of industrialists from strikers. Under the protection of a Callista official, if not Calles himself, Nicolás Rodríguez Carrasco founded the Green Shirts (Camisas Verdes) in 1932. Rodríguez Carrasco had joined the Pro-Race Committee a year prior. The Green Shirts were a paramilitary group which was characterized as anti-communist, anti-union, ultranationalist. Calles politically protected and financially supported the group. The Green Shirts's campaigned under the mantra of "Mexico for Mexicans". As Calles began to lose power under Abelardo Rodríguez, the group was shortly dissolved by Rodríguez after taking power in September of that year.

=== Foundation and early activities (1933–1935) ===
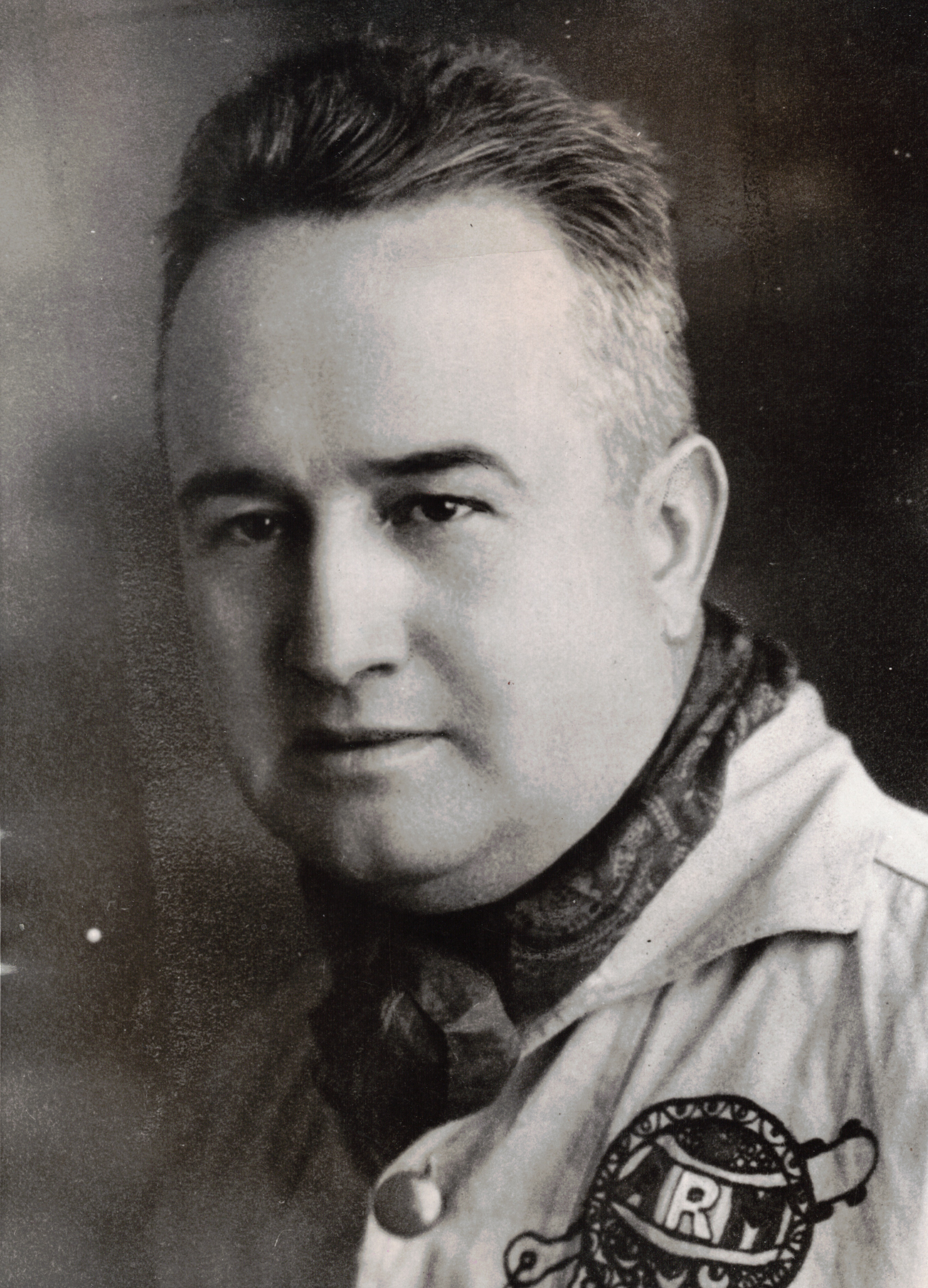
Rodríguez Carrasco's Revolutionary Mexicanist Action portrait, circa 1934

The Revolutionary Mexicanist Action was founded on March 10, 1934, within the Pro-Race Committee of the Federal District. The organization declared its fundamental objective was the moral and aggrandizement of Mexico, stating that their struggle "was not an offensive against foreigners but rather a defense of national interests."

The founders and early members were generals and other ex-military men. Prominent members included Nicolás Rodríguez Carrasco, Roque González Garza (instrumental figure during the Mexican Revolution and former acting President of Mexico), Julio Madero González (brother of Francisco I. Madero and Gustavo A. Madero), Silvestre Terrazas (former Governor of Chihuahua), and Eduardo Dávila Garza (Head of the Mexican Catholic Apostolic Church). Other key members included Ovidio Pedrero Valenzuela and Andrés Morán.

Roque González Garza led the group for a few months from its foundation until Nicolás Rodríguez Carrasco assumed the position of supreme leader.

==== 1935 Revolution Day Riot ====
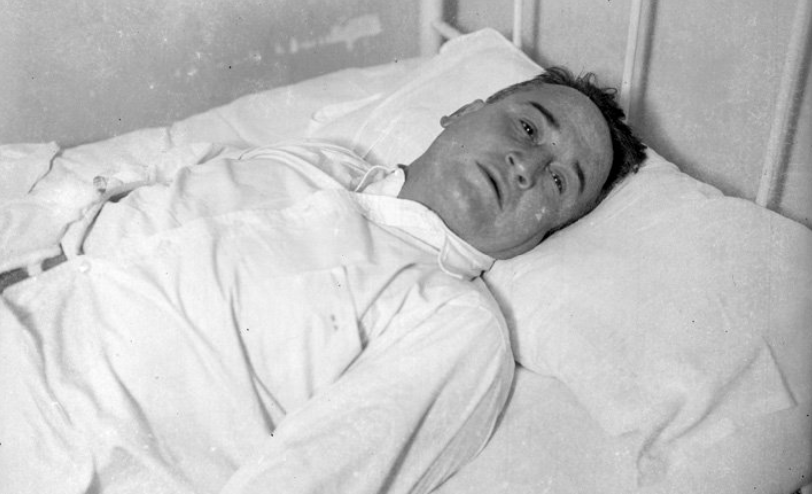
Rodriguez Carrasco in the hospital for the wounds he received during the riot.

Tensions between Calles and president Lázaro Cárdenas rose with the latter increasing the suppression efforts of the Gold Shirts. On November 20, 1935, a violent clash between communists and the Gold Shirts during the Revolution Day parade at the Zócalo resulted in 3 deaths and more than 40 injuries of which included Rodríguez Carrasco. Rodríguez Carrasco was stabbed twice in the abdomen and left critically injured.

=== Political pushback and Ban (1935–1936) ===
The incident sparked nation-wide public outrage against the Revolutionary Mexicanist Actiontion, mainly from labor organizations. The Mexican senate sought to ban the organization a day after the riot. On November 22, senators Ernesto Soto Reyes and Guillermo Flores Muñoz condemned the Gold Shirts for the incident and called for a commission to ban the group. In his speech, Soto Reyes state the organization was composed of "irresponsible straw-men" and called into question the legitimacy of the group. He asserted the organization did not represent any union or worker's interests and therefore did not contravene any legal statue by requesting its prohibition.

==== Disbandment (1936) ====
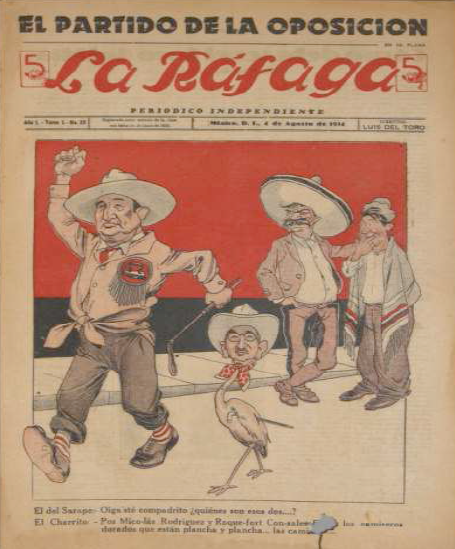
Caricature of Nicolas Rodriguez Carrasco and Roque Gonzalez Garza on the front page of a communist magazine in 1935

In February 1936, the group participated in anti-communist rallies in Monterrey and in Puebla. The Monterrey rally was filmed by fascist film director and Gold Shirts supporter Gustavo Sáenz de Sicilia. Members of the ARM engaged in gunfire with the police, leaving 10 members dead. Following this incident, on February 27, 1936, Cárdenas ordered the dissolution of the group.

On February 27, 1936, Cárdenas ordered the dissolution of the group. On August 11, Rodríguez Carrasco was arrested for promoting "inter-labor conflicts" and was set to be expelled from the country. He was detained in Pachuca where was driven to an airport and flown to Ciudad Juárez then to El Paso, Texas. Following his exile, Rodríguez Carrasco was classified as a non-threat by the Mexican government.

=== Organization in exile (1936–1940) ===
Rodríguez Carrasco moved to Laredo, Texas, with his wife, Leonor Gutiérrez. Rodríguez Carrasco established a Revolutionary Mexicanist Action headquarters in Mission, Texas. Rodríguez Carrasco approached wealthy Texan oilmen whose assets in Mexico were negatively affected by worker strikes and government policies for funds. Other donors he personally received funds from included Reverend P.L. Delgado, William H. Wood, and a wealthy farmer only known as Smithers. Throughout this time, Rodríguez Carrasco drafted numerous manifestos against the Mexican government, Jews, communists, and President Cárdenas in The McAllen Monitor.

Rodríguez Carrasco also met with Henry Allen in 1937. Allen was a prominent figure of an American antisemitic fascist group known as the Silver Legion. Allen offered Rodríguez Carrasco protection and both directly received funds from the Nazi Party.

By March 1937, Rodríguez Carrasco was receiving $2000 to $3000 a month in donations from American and Mexican nationals alike for the Revolutionary Mexicanist Action. The money was given to contacts that would regularly travel between Brownsville and Nogales.

Approximately just under a year after moving to Texas, Rodríguez Carrasco met young woman named Emilia Herron. Herron belonged to a very wealthy family El Paso. Herron and Rodríguez Carrasco developed an affair and then divorced his wife Leonor Gutiérrez. Rodríguez Carrasco contacted immigration services to have Gutiérrez deported back to Mexico. A distraught Gutiérrez brought with her a great volume of documents containing sensitive information regarding the Revolutionary Mexicanist Action. She notified the police of Mexico City of Rodríguez Carrasco's activities. She made many public declarations regarding the organization's activities against the government and named many public figures who supported the paramilitary group. This caused serious internal conflicts within the organization with some prominent members no longer supporting Rodríguez Carrasco.

==== Rebellion plot (1938) ====
Since at least 1935, the organization had been plotting a rebellion against the Mexican government. Carlos Walterio Steinman, a former colonel in the Mexican Army residing in New York, told Rodríguez Carrasco he had raised over 4 million dollars to help in a "change of government" in a letter dated July 3, 1935.

The Gold Shirts received funds to purchase armament from former governor of San Luis Potosí and very close friend of Rodríguez, Saturnino Cedillo. Cedillo, who by 1937 had close alleged ties to German Nazis, had developed major political and personal grievances with Cárdenas. Cedillo had several private meetings with members of the Revolutionary Mexicanist Action.

The Mexican Government had received various reports on Rodríguez Carrasco's plot and purchases of weapons. On January 31, 1938, the rebellion was launched in Tamaulipas, where troops had been already dispatched at the request of Tamaulipas governor Marte R. Gómez. Three Gold Shirts members and one police officer were killed in a day of fighting.

==== Rodríguez Carrasco's illness and death (1940) ====
Following the thwarted rebellion, Rodríguez Carrasco lost a considerable amount of financial support as well as support from the Gold Shirts. He remained exiled in Texas while continuing to publish articles for The McAllen Monitor.

By 1940, Rodríguez Carrasco developed a blood illness, most likely aplastic anemia. Following the quick deterioration of his health, Rodríguez Carrasco effectively stepped down as leader of the Gold Shirts. In August 1940, Rodríguez Carrasco requested a pardon from President Cárdenas to be allowed to return to Mexico stating he wished to pass in his mother's house citing his illness. The request was approved and he returned to Mexico on August 5. He died 6 days later on August 11 in his mother's house from his illness.

=== Schism (1940s) ===
The inauguration of Manuel Ávila Camacho seemingly ended the Revolutionary Mexicanist Action ban. Following the death of Nicolás Rodríguez Carrasco, two separate factions led by Aniceto López Salazar and Joaquín Rodríguez Carrasco (brother of Nicolás) emerged from the Gold Shirts. Both figures laid claim to be the true heirs of the organization. López Salazar and Joaquin's factions were based in Mexico City and Chihuahua respectively. Joaquín Rodríguez Carrasco's faction retained the organization's original objectives as the more radical and militant members comprised this group. López Salazar's faction was noted to have developed anti-fascist sentiments, less xenophobia and antisemitism, while remaining implacably opposed to communism and labor-strikes. This faction also was noted to have been much more amendable with the government with López Salazar consistently publicly disavowing the group's past violent actions. López Salazar and other members of his faction routinely met with government officials to discuss the paramilitary's role in "maintaining national interests".

On International Workers' Day, 1952, the "Golden Shirts" attacked contingents of the Communist Party and the Peasant Workers Party in front of the Palace of Fine Arts in Alameda Central. In the confrontation Luis Morales Jiménez, a student of the IPN, and Lucio Arciniega, a shoemaker artisan, members of the Communist Youth, died.

By the 1960s, membership reached 500,000 in Mexico and the United States. A significant number of members belonged to the Mexican Army or law enforcement. The Mexican government routinely hired the paramilitary group to combat left-wing paramilitaries. However, the group faced persistent funding problems, and by the 1970s the Gold Shirts appeared to have dissolved, with no notable activity. Some former members later joined the neo-fascist Mexican Democratic Party.

== Organization and structure ==
Initially, organizing, directing messages, appointments, as well as basic tasks were all carried out by Rodriguez Carrasco. By May 1934, however, the ARM was divided into 15 zones. The zones were divided throughout the country but mainly in Mexico City. Each of these zones consisted of several groups of 10 to 15 individuals. Each group had a sub-chief who only reported to the zone chief who, in turn, would report to the supreme chief. By 1935, the ARM had 350 group leaders in the 15 zones. At this time, the organization had approximately 4000 members.

In the Mexico City chapter, there were a total of 377 members. Many members had been former military which included 14 generals, 7 lieutenant colonels, 13 colonels, 3 majors, 3 captains, 1 first sergeant, 1 lieutenant, a police chief, and a cop. General Vicente Gonzalez, chief of Mexico City's police force, was also in close contact with Rodriguez Carrasco.

The headquarters of the Mexicanist Revolutionary Action was in a two-story building used by the organization, the headquarters was located on Calle Justo Sierra 29 in the Historic Center of Mexico City, one street from the Historical Jewish Synagogue. "A two-story building, in one of the oldest places in the city, overlooking the main headquarters of the ARM, a Mexican fascist party, well armed, with shirts, symbols, salutes and a strong nationalist creed of hatred of Jews and the communists. The entire upper floor is occupied by the offices of the Dorados, the premises must have been rented with a view to future expansion. The house occupied by the Mexicanist Revolutionary Action on Justo Sierra Street was converted into a real one. There were more than a hundred men ready for anything and no less than 500 weapons, as well as clubs and stones, inside the building. A medical team was also formed (mostly nurses and male nurses with the Yaoyotl embroidered on their clothing). The organization had a female Section called Mexican Nationalist Women's Action in charge of Leonor Gutiérrez, the first wife of General Carrasco.

Some other outstanding and very important women within the group and the organization were, Margarita Vda. de Cárdenas, María de la Paz Luque and Teresa Castrejón. "Mexican women have sacred obligations towards the people and the country, for that reason, and because we are golden affiliates of the A.R.M." 1936.

In 1939 the Mexican Nationalist Women's Action led a protest against abortion led by Victoria Huante. “Mexican women cannot remain calm when they see that in a State that is part of a country that prides itself on cult, there is an attempt to denigrate the mission of women, putting them at the level of inferior beings who do not have a clear idea. of what it means for humanity to dignify and honor the creation of new beings.

=== 1934 leadership ===
The council of the Gold shirts were known as the Mesa Directiva.

Mesa Directiva Leadership 1934
Name	Title
Gen. Lucio G Verdiguel	Secretary General
Manuel Rodriguez Carrasco	Treasurer
Alfredo Serratos	Organization Secretary
Gen. Miguel M Ramos	Secretary of education
Gen. Jose M Sanchez	Secretary of Hacienda
Gen Arturo E Valverde	Secretary of Agriculture
Salvador Diaz F.	Chief of Migration
Gen. Jose E Solares	Chief Assistant

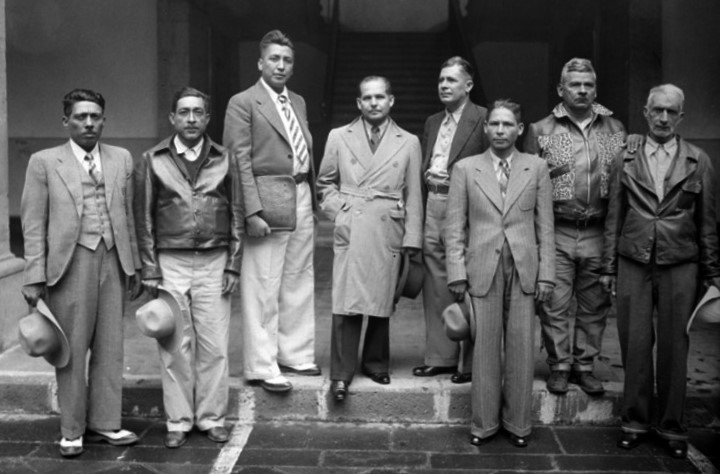
Revolutionary Mexicanist Action zone chiefs. Individuals not identified.

By 1934, the organization had branches registered in: Villa Union, Mazatlan, Concordia, Culiacan, Saltillo, Torreon, Coahuila, Durango, Chiuahua, Juarez, Toluca, Monterrey, Nuevo León, Nuevo Laredo, Tamaulipas, Sabinas, Hidalgo, Puebla Texmelucan, Tehuacan, Guadalajara, Orizaba, Veracruz, Iguala Guerrero. Each of these chapters had leaders referred to as Chiefs.

Chief of Zones
Name
Jose Vela
Matias Rodriguez
Agapito Lopez
Enrique Backmaann
Primitivo Gonzales
Col. M. Sanchez T.
Manuel Gonzales
Rafael Plata
Jesus Carcia
German Ramirez
Daniel M. Trejo
1st Captain Jose Ramos
Felipe Garcia
Teodoro Buendia

== Beliefs ==
Their motto was "Mexico for the Mexicans," a racialized or ethnic group that excluded Mexicans of Jewish or Chinese descent, and those who held anti-fascist political views, supported trade unions, or were communists or socialists. Rodríguez claimed that blood tests carried out by ethnographers showed that Mexicans and Nordic peoples were racially equal. They were fiercely antisemitic and Sinophobic: they demanded the removal of citizenship from and immediate deportation of Jews and Chinese from Mexico, with all their businesses turned over to "Mexicans."

Although the dorados copied their style from the German Blackshirts and Sturmabteilung, the anti-communism and authoritarianism of the former and the antisemitism of the latter, they nonetheless lacked the fascist mission, and were essentially counterrevolutionary and reactionary, and as such were more easily employed by the existing state, according to fascism expert Stanley G. Payne. John W. Sherman, an expert in Mexican right-wing organizations, describes them as "fascist" and "fascist-inspired," for their nationalistic, racist, and pro-business beliefs and activities.

=== Respect for Hitler ===
Nicolás Rodríguez, founder of the ARM, said about Adolf Hitler:

"Hitler, an insignificant ex-soldier of the world war, but a man of clear vision and an unsuspected love for his homeland; he took in at a glance the great problem of the Jewish danger, matured his plans, and when he found himself master of Germany, he bravely faced the situation and expelled without mercy, in a brilliant and audacious act, all the Jews residing in the Reich."

== Activities ==
The Gold Shirts often violently clashed with supporters of the Mexican Communist Party and the Red Shirts, including a famous attack on a communist protest in 1935 in Mexico City at the Zócalo. Three people died and over fifty were injured, including Rodríguez. They ransacked communist party offices on various occasions.

ARM members were often hired to intimidate workers or to prevent agrarian reform on haciendas. They attacked workers in Monterrey in 1936 as part of their anti-union activities.

On one night in 1936, the Gold Shirts raided Jewish businesses, destroying them and attacking their owners. The protests in response were immediate, highlighting those of the United States embassy, the Mexican Communist Party, and the International Red Aid. The general public described the event as a pogrom.

== See also ==
- Red Shirts
- Gun politics in Mexico
