= Museo Archivo de la Fotografía =

- Museum of the Photographic Archive
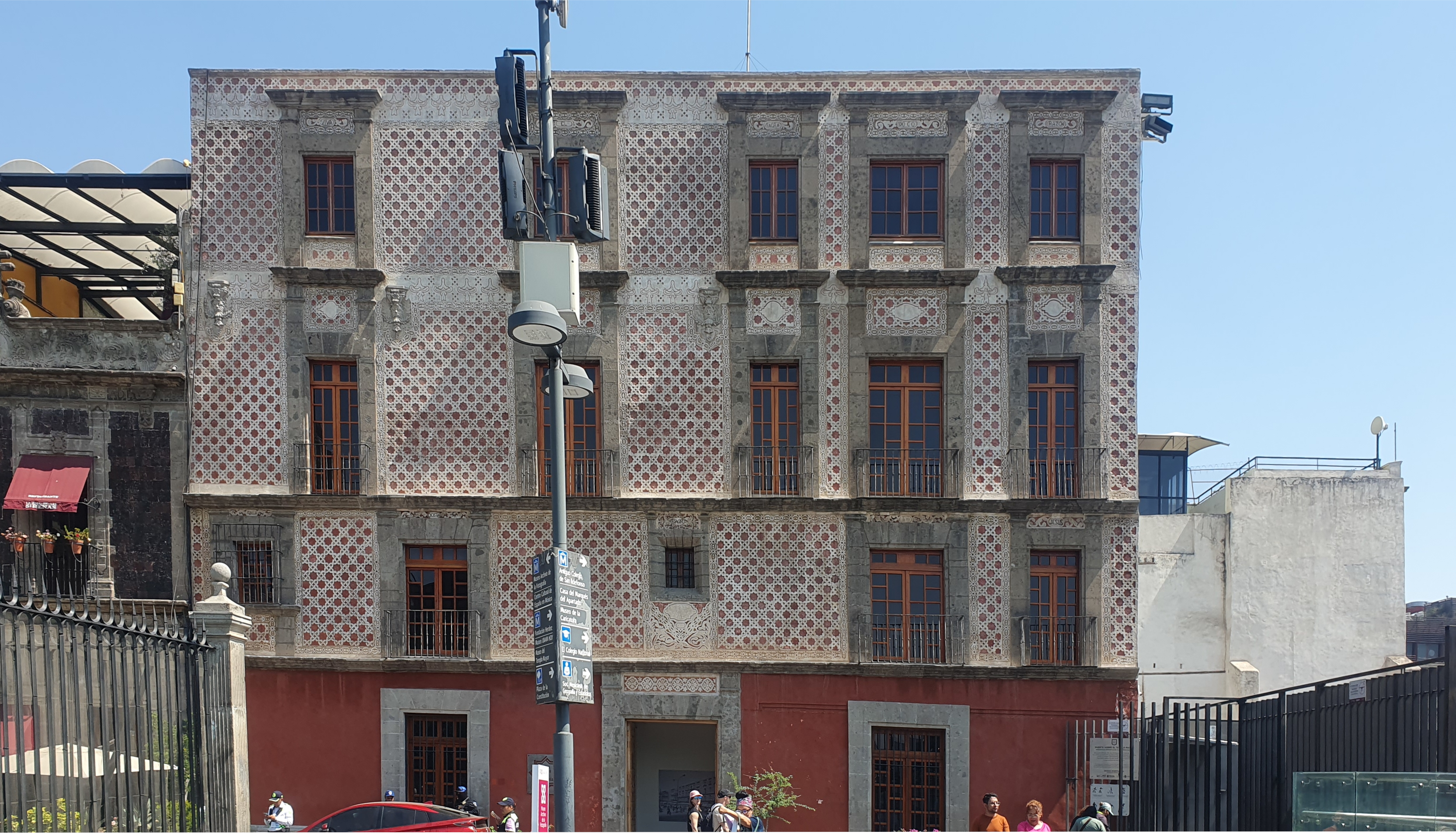
- Location in Mexico City
- Location: Guatemala street #34, Historic center of Mexico City
- Coordinates: 19.435056°N 99.132143°W

The Museo Archivo de la Fotografía (MAF; Museum of the Photographic Archive) is a museum in the Historic center of Mexico City located in "La Casa de las Ajaracas", built at the end of the 16th century, at Guatemala street #34. The museum is dedicated to the conservation, research and distribution of photography.
