= Plaza Manuel Gamio =

Plaza in Mexico City

Coordinates: 19°26′03″N 99°07′55″W

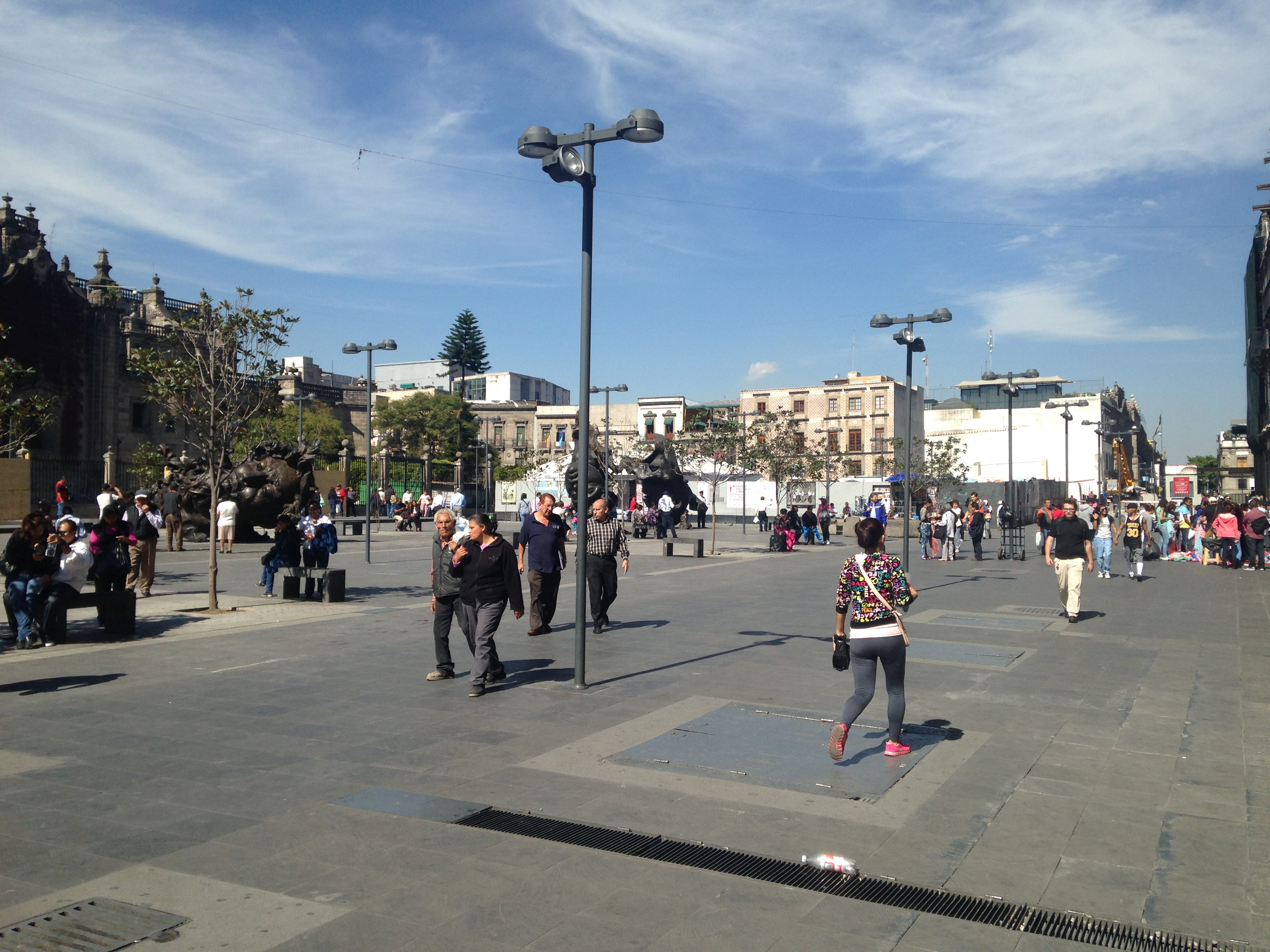
- Plaza Manuel Gamio in 2015
- Interactive map of Plaza Manuel Gamio
- Location: Mexico City, Mexico

The Plaza Manuel Gamio is a plaza located in historic center of Mexico City, Mexico. It is located between the archaeological zone of the Templo Mayor and the tabernacle of the Metropolitan Cathedral. It was named in honor of Manuel Gamio, the archaeologist of the excavations of the ceremonial precinct of the Mexica, and includes the space between the streets of Moneda (to the south) and a fragment of the República de Guatemala to the north. Due to its proximity to the Templo Mayor, it is a frequent site of important finds from ancient Tenochtitlan and due to its proximity to the site where the first urban layout of the current Mexican capital was made in 1522, it is close to places where the first headquarters of the Royal and Pontifical University of Mexico was established, the first headquarters of the Mexican Mint, the archbishop's house and the aforementioned cathedral and the first Ethnographic Museum of the Instituto Nacional de Antropología e Historia (INAH), among others.

It was from the works of creation of the archaeological zone from 1978 in which the plaza received its current configuration and the definitive closure to vehicular traffic of streets such as Seminario.

== Denomination ==
The plaza is called in various ways as there is no official nomenclature on its name. It is called Plaza Manuel Gamio by the INAH, although in some sources it appears as Del Seminario or Del Templo Mayor.

== History ==
Inside the Templo Mayor of México-Tenochtitlan, according to Ignacio Marquina's map, the space of the plaza would be the one between the southwestern side of the great teocalli of the Templo Mayor and its coatepantli, the southeastern wall of the Temple of Ehécatl-Quetzalcóatl and the Temple to Chicomecóatl.

After 1521 and after the coverage of the Mexica city and the construction of the Hispanic one began, near this plaza the first layout of the city was made by Alonso García Bravo and in its northern end the Isla de los Perros would have been located, a promontory that would have been built by the Mexicas and that in New Spain was a shelter site for dogs during the floods of the capital.

The space of the square would have been assigned by Hernán Cortés to the construction of the new cathedral of New Spain, and would have been later occupied by houses assigned to the Cathedral chapter. Around 1689, construction began in this space of the Real Colegio Seminario next to the cathedral, which was inaugurated in 1697 and the rest of the space adjoining the Plaza Mayor (today of the Constitution it would be simply called at the end of the 18th century as the patio de la pila. Hereafter this plaza would be linked to the popular Paseo de las Cadenas, a space outside the cathedral lined with chains and iron posts, trees, masonry benches and lighting with public lighting. The seminary was proposed for demolition in 18612 after confiscation of church assets, but the building was sold and the Hotel Seminario was installed in that place. offices of the Consulate of the United States, among others. Henceforth the space would be known as Rinconada del Seminario, and at different times in the second half of the 19th century circuses, theaters and mechanical games would be installed, as well as a car site and a drugstore also called Seminario.

In 1913 at the corner of Seminario and Escalerillas, Manuel Gamio detected one of the corners of the Mexica Templo Mayor. In 1924 it was decided to modify the site to turn it into a square, widening the sidewalk, installing planters, some public bathrooms that remained until 1972 and a fountain dedicated to Fray Bartolomé de las Casas, today next to the cathedral but inside its bars. In 1933 both the building of the former Seminary and the adjacent one of the Colegio de Infantes were demolished. The site was intervened again around 1944 to remove debris that still remained in the area and with the aim of giving a better urban image to the adjacent cathedral. With the works of Line 2 of the Mexico City Metro, the so-called Plaza del Seminario was intervened again, removing the bathrooms and some gardens installed on the sides of the cathedral.

t was with the works of the Templo Mayor from 1978 that this area was modified, with the consequent complete demolition of adjacent buildings to create the new archaeological zone. In its place, the new Plaza Manuel Gamio was made, with the installation in addition to garden areas, of a 97.5-square-meter model in the middle of a fountain that showed a hypothetical reconstruction of ancient Mexico-Tenochtitlan. The area always remained with the presence of street vendors and traditional dancers.

In 2014 the Government of the Federal District began the restoration of this plaza, removing the model. The space was partially opened in 2015.

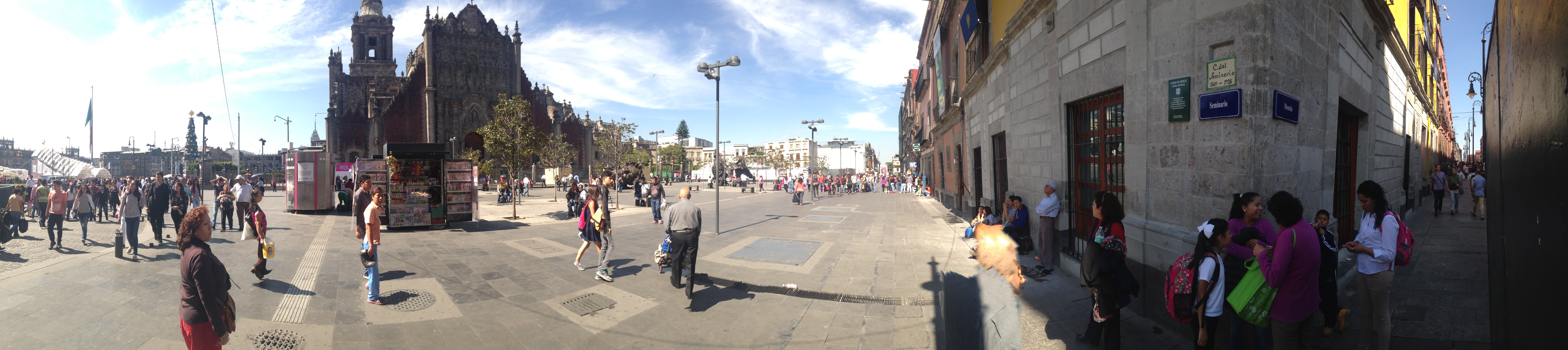
Panoramic view of Plaza Manuel Gamio, looking north
