= Firearms regulation in Mexico =

Overview of gun politics and laws in Mexico

Firearms regulation in Mexico is governed by legislation which sets the legality by which members of the armed forces, law enforcement and private citizens may acquire, own, possess and carry firearms; covering rights and limitations to individuals—including hunting and shooting sport participants, property and personal protection personnel such as bodyguards, security officers, private security, and extending to VIPs (diplomats, public officials, celebrities).

Mexico has restrictive laws regarding gun possession. There are only two stores in the entire country, DCAM near the capital, and OTCA, in Apodaca, Nuevo León. It also takes months of paperwork to have a chance at purchasing one legally. That said, there is a common misconception that firearms are illegal in Mexico and that no person may possess them. This belief originates from the general perception that only members of law enforcement, the armed forces, or those in armed security protection are authorized to have them. While it is true that Mexico possesses strict gun laws, where most types and calibers are reserved to military and law enforcement, the acquisition and ownership of certain firearms and ammunition remains a constitutional right to all Mexican citizens and foreign legal residents; given the requirements and conditions to exercise such right are fulfilled in accordance to the law.

The right to keep and bear arms was first recognized as a constitutional right under Article 10 of the Mexican Constitution of 1857. However, as part of the Mexican Constitution of 1917, Article 10 was changed where-by the right to keep and bear arms was given two separate definitions: the right to keep (derecho a poseer in Spanish) and the right to bear (derecho a portar in Spanish). The new version of Article 10 specified that citizens were entitled to keep arms (own them) but may only bear them (carry them) among the population in accordance to police regulation. This modification to Article 10 also introduced the so-called ...[arms] for exclusive use of the [military]... (in Spanish: ...de uso exclusivo del Ejército...), dictating that the law would stipulate which weapons were reserved for the armed forces, including law enforcement agencies, for being considered weapons of war.

In 1971, Article 10 of the present Constitution was changed to limit the right to keep arms within the home only (in Spanish: ...derecho a poseer armas en su domicilio...) and reserved the right to bear arms outside the home only to those explicitly authorized by law (i.e. police, military, armed security officers). The following year, the Federal Law of Firearms and Explosives came into force and gave the federal government complete jurisdiction and control to the legal proliferation of firearms in the country; at the same time, heavily limiting and restricting the legal access to firearms by civilians.

As a result of the changes to Article 10 of the Mexican Constitution and the enactment of the Federal Law of Firearms and Explosives, openly carrying a firearm or carrying a concealed weapon in public is virtually forbidden to private citizens, unless explicitly authorized by the Secretariat of National Defense (SEDENA). For purposes of personal protection, firearms are only permitted within the place of residence and of the type and caliber permitted by law.

== History ==
Firearms have played a significant role in the History of Mexico, and the country was founded with a strong presence and adhesion to arms, though Mexico has a long history of passing gun restriction laws. Mexican Golden Age films often depicted the protagonists and antagonists as gun-slinging cowboys and charros, an example of a cultural attachment to guns which greatly differs on different sides of the border. In the United States, the right to bear arms is recognized, allowing citizens to carry guns. In contrast, in Mexico, the public possession of guns is often in defiance of strict national gun laws, marking a significant difference in the legal attitudes towards firearms in the two countries.

It was through the means of armed combat that Mexico achieved its independence from Spain. From then on, the course of history was marked by several armed conflicts, including the American (1846–48) and French (1861–67) conflicts, as well as indigenous struggles due to the several forms of government that ruled over Mexican territory, culminating with the Mexican Revolution (1910–20) and the Cristero War (1926–29).

In 1972, the government modified Article 10 of the Constitution and enacted the Federal Law of Firearms and Explosives, limiting gun ownership to small-caliber handguns, heavily restricting the right to carry outside the homeplace and ending a cultural attachment to firearms by shutting down gun stores, outlawing the private sale of firearms, and closing down public shooting facilities.

In addition, the government has conducted gun-exchange programs from time to time, where citizens are encouraged to exchange any firearm (registered, unregistered, legal or illegal) for either a cash incentive or groceries, without fear of civil or criminal prosecution.

=== Historical legislation ===
Prior to the Independence of Mexico, the first official record of a restriction on the possession of firearms occurred in 1811 as the Mexican War of Independence was taking place. This restriction came about as an attempt to stop the Miguel Hidalgo-led insurgency against the Royalists of Spain. In 1812 and 1814 the Constitution of the Spanish Monarchy in Article 56 and Constitutional Decree for the Liberty of Mexican America in Article 81 prohibited appearing at Vestry meetings with weapons, but did not limit their possession or carrying on other sites such as the home.

Following Mexico's independence as the First Mexican Empire in 1822, the Political Provisional Regulation of the Mexican Empire in Article 54 made a reference to the carrying of prohibited arms (in Spanish: ...el porte de armas prohibidas...) and by 1824, following the establishment of the United Mexican States, it was declared that no person shall carry any type of weapon. The inclination to adopt a complete ban on firearms came as a precaution and attempt to prevent another armed insurrection that would put the new republic in jeopardy. After this measure, four years followed without war under President Guadalupe Victoria.

However, the results of the presidential elections of September 1828 were disputed by runner-up candidate Vicente Guerrero and he called for a revolution, provoking Congress to annul the election and elect Guerrero as president. After he took office in April 1829, civil unrest continued and he was ousted by mid-December only for two other men to serve as president before the end of the year. After Anastasio Bustamante took office in January 1830, considering the instability of the previous year, a mandate was issued that required all in unlawful possession of firearms to surrender them to the government and made it illegal to pawn or purchase them. Between 1831 and 1835, additional mandates were issued voiding all gun licenses previously issued and restricted the issuance of new firearm permits only to those deemed "peaceful, known and honest" and made acquiring a license to carry a more rigorous process.

Continuing several decades of instability, Mexico became once again a federal republic and given the important role firearms had played to establish the second republic, the Constitution of 1857 under Article 10, recognized for the first time the right for people to keep and bear arms as a constitutional guarantee. Also in 1857, another mandate was issued requiring a firearms license in order to carry lawfully. In February 1861, the Secretary of War (now the Secretariat of National Defense) issued a notice reassuring all citizens the guarantee to keep and carry firearms, and expressing that considering that under no circumstances could peaceful and lawful citizens be disarmed, only weapons exclusive of the military would be banned. In December of the same year, a mandate required all persons to surrender such banned weapons.

In 1893, new regulation on the bearing of arms was issued, recognizing the right to keep and the right to carry while regulating the issuance of licenses to carry, which conditioned that weapons only be carried in a manner that they are visible.

At the height of the Mexican Revolution, the Constitution of 1917 was enacted and Article 10, carried over from the previous constitution, was modified to define three separate things: one) it recognized the right of the people to keep and bear arms, two) it excepted from civilian possession weapons prohibited by law or reserved for the military, and three) it required that weapons carried in public be done in accordance to the law.

The 1960s were marked by a series of anti-government movements that escalated to the Tlatelolco massacre, prompting then-President Echeverría and Mexican Congress to modify Article 10 of the Constitution to its present form today, which permits private ownership of firearms within the home only. In January 1972, with the enactment of the Federal Law of Firearms and Explosives, the legal proliferation of firearms among the population was heavily limited and restricted.

Since its conception, the Federal Law of Firearms and Explosives has had several of its articles reformed in an effort to further restrict firearm ownership and their proliferation by imposing stricter rules for their acquisition and tougher penalties for violations.

== Constitutional rights ==
Three major events mark the right to keep and bear arms as a constitutional guarantee:

=== Constitution of 1857 ===
To keep and bear arms was first recognized as a constitutional right through Article 10 of the Mexican Constitution of 1857:

(original text) Artículo 10: Todo hombre tiene derecho de poseer y portar armas para su seguridad y legítima defensa. La ley señalará cuáles son las prohibidas y la pena en que incurren los que las portaren.

(translation) Article 10: Every man has the right to keep and to carry arms for his security and legitimate defense. The law will indicate which arms are prohibited and the penalty for those who would carry them.

Article 10 of the 1857 Constitution gave citizens the right to keep and bear arms, both in their homes and in public for their security and defense. Legislation was to indicate which types of weapons would be forbidden and the penalties imposed to violators.

=== Constitution of 1917 ===
Sixty years later, with the introduction of the Constitution of 1917, Article 10 gives two separate definitions to the right to keep and bear arms:

(original text) Artículo 10: Los habitantes de los Estados Unidos Mexicanos tienen libertad de poseer armas de cualquiera clase, para su seguridad y legítima defensa, hecha excepción de las prohibidas expresamente por la ley y de las que la nación reserve para el uso exclusivo del Ejército, Armada y Guardia Nacional; pero no podrán portarlas en las poblaciones sin sujetarse a los reglamentos de policía..

(translation) Article 10: The inhabitants of the United Mexican States are free to possess weapons of any kind, for their security and legitimate defense, with exception of those expressly prohibited by law and that the nation reserves for the exclusive use of the Army, Navy and National Guard; but they may not carry them within populations without being subject to police regulations.

Article 10 of the 1917 Constitution still allowed citizens to keep and bear arms in the home or outside, while restricting those weapons reserved to the military but required that those who carry weapons in public, adhere to applicable police regulations.

=== Reform to Article 10 in 1971 ===
Fifty-four years later, Article 10 was reformed to its actual text in force today:

(original text) Artículo 10: Los habitantes de los Estados Unidos Mexicanos tienen derecho a poseer armas en su domicilio, para seguridad y legítima defensa, con excepción de las prohibidas por la ley federal y de las reservadas para el uso exclusivo del Ejército, Armada, Fuerza Aérea y Guardia Nacional. La ley federal determinará los casos, condiciones, requisitos y lugares en que se podrá autorizar a los habitantes la portación de armas.

(translation) Article 10: The inhabitants of the United Mexican States have the right to keep arms in their homes, for security and legitimate defense, with the exception of those prohibited by federal law and those reserved for the exclusive use of the Army, Navy, Air Force and National Guard. Federal law will determine the cases, conditions, requirements, and places in which the carrying of arms will be authorized to the inhabitants.

Reformed Article 10 limited citizens' constitutional right to keeping arms in their homes only. Additionally, carrying firearms outside the home (in public) was no longer a right but a privilege federal law would regulate and authorize on a case-by-case basis. With this reform came the Federal Law of Firearms and Explosives, which limited civilians' legal access to a few small-caliber guns while reserving most types and calibers to the government (i.e., police and military).

== Licensing and legislation ==
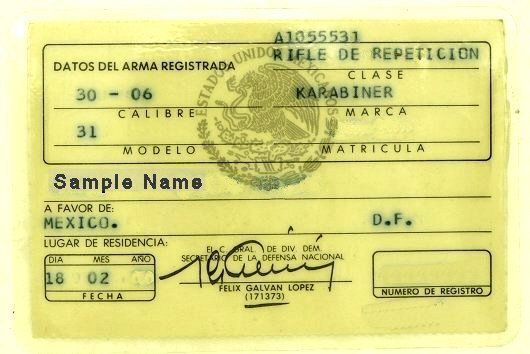
Mexican Firearms Registration Card

The authority in charge of the control of firearms in Mexico is the Executive Branch (Ejecutivo Federal) through the Secretariat of Interior (SEGOB) and the Secretariat of National Defense (SEDENA), the latter responsible for issuing licenses and running the General Directorate for the Federal Firearms Registry and Explosives Control (DGRFAFyCE).

The Federal Law of Firearms and Explosives (Ley Federal de Armas de Fuego y Explosivos) is an act of Congress and the legal framework overseeing the lawful proliferation of firearms in the country, including their import, manufacture, sale, purchase, ownership, and possession.

The Regulation of the Federal Law of Firearms and Explosives (Reglamento de la Ley Federal de Armas de Fuego y Explosivos) is an additional legal framework governing firearms.

=== The right to keep arms ===
In regard to the right to keep arms, Title II, Chapter II, Article 15 of the Federal Law of Firearms and Explosives states:

(translated) Weapons may be kept in the home for security and legitimate defense of its dwellers. Their possession imposes the duty to manifest them to the Secretariat of National Defense for their registration. For every weapon, record of its registration will be issued.

Under this clause, citizens are entitled to keep firearms of the type and calibers permitted by law for their security and defense within their home only. Every weapon must be registered with the federal government. While federal law does not set a limit, in legal practice, citizens are only allowed to keep a total of 10 registered firearms (nine long guns, one handgun) per household.

Additionally, a place of business or employment is not covered under this provision unless the place of business is the same as the place of residence (home business) and therefore it is illegal to keep or carry a firearm in a place of business, even if the business is owned by the lawful registered owner of the weapon unless the appropriate license to carry outside the home is issued by SEDENA.

=== The right to bear arms ===
In regard to the right to bear arms (carry them beyond the home), Title II, Chapter III, Article 24 of the Federal Law of Firearms and Explosives states:

(translated) To carry weapons, the appropriate license is required. Members of the Army, Navy and Air Force are exempted from the foregoing, in the cases and conditions stipulated by applicable laws and regulations. Members of federal, state, of the Federal District, and municipal police institutions, as well as private security services, may carry weapons in the cases, conditions, and requirements established by present law and other applicable legal provisions.

Under this clause, only citizens who have been granted a license to carry can lawfully carry a firearm outside their homes. Beyond military and law enforcement members, these permits are only issued to persons who qualify such as those employed in private security firms, those who live in rural areas, or those who may be targets of crime (politicians, public officials, and wealthy citizens).

=== Type of firearms permitted ===
In regard to what type of firearms are permitted, Title II, Chapter I, Article 9 of the Federal Law of Firearms and Explosives states:

(translated) It may be kept or carried, under the terms and limitations established by this law, weapons of the following characteristics:

1. Semi-automatic handguns of caliber no greater than .380 (9mm Browning, 9mm Corto, 9mm Kurz, 9mm Short, and 9×17mm). Left excepted are calibers .38 Super and .38 commander, and also calibers 9mm. [Such as] Mauser, Luger, etc., as well as similar models of the same caliber of the excepted, from other brands.
2. Revolvers of calibers no greater than .38 Special, left excepted is caliber .357 magnum.
  Land tenure owners, common land owners and farmworkers outside urban zones, may keep and carry, upon registration, one weapon of those already mentioned, or a .22 caliber rifle, or a shotgun of any caliber, except those of a barrel length shorter than 25 inches (635mm) and of caliber greater than 12 gauge (.729" or 18.5 MM).

Additionally, Article 10 of the Federal Law of Firearms and Explosives states:

(translated) The firearms that can be authorized to participants of shooting or hunting, to keep in their home or to carry with a license, are the following:

1. Semi-automatic handguns, revolvers and rifles of caliber .22, rimfire ammo
2. Handguns of .38 caliber for Olympic shooting or other competition
3. Shotguns in all their calibers and models, except those with a barrel length shorter than 25 inches, and calibers greater than 12 gauge.
4. Triple-barrel shotguns in the calibers authorized in the preceding section, with a barrel for metallic cartridges of different caliber.
5. High-powered rifles, of repeating or semi-automatic function, non-convertible to full-auto, with the exception of .30 caliber carbines, rifles, muskets and carbines caliber .223, 7 and 7.62mm, and Garand rifles caliber .30.
6. High-powered rifles of greater caliber than those mentioned in the previous section, with special permission for their use abroad, for hunting of game bigger than those present in national wildlife.

Under these two articles, private citizens are generally restricted to semi-automatic handguns or revolvers of a caliber no greater than .380 (for home defense), rifles no greater than .22, and shotguns no greater than 12 gauge (hunting and shooting when a member of a club). Anything bigger than those calibers is considered for exclusive use of the military and strictly forbidden for civilian possession, as defined by Article 11 of the Federal Law of Firearms and Explosives. Only citizens with collector permits may be authorized to possess firearms outside those permitted for civilian ownership.

=== How many firearms may be owned ===
In regard to how many firearms a citizen may own, neither the Constitution nor the Federal Law of Firearms and Explosives say anything; however, Chapter II, Article 21 of the Regulation of the Federal Law of Firearms and Explosives states:

(translated) If more than two weapons are registered for security and legitimate defense of the dwellers of a single home, those interested must justify the need.

This clause is somewhat controversial among gun enthusiasts in Mexico because current federal law does not set a limit on how many firearms may be owned. However, the Secretariat of National Defense (SEDENA) has set its own rules (in Spanish: Disposiciones giradas por la propia Secretaría), and while neither federal firearms law nor its regulation set a limit on the amount of firearms a person may own, SEDENA has determined that only nine long guns and one handgun for hunting or shooting activities will be authorized. Consequently, those who do not belong to a hunting or shooting club, will only be authorized one handgun for home defense. If the citizen is an official member of the Mexican hunting and shooting federation they will be allowed to have more than one handgun but always with the 10 gun limit.

=== Transport of firearms ===
In regard to the transport of firearms, Title III, Chapter IV, Article 60 of the Federal Law of Firearms and Explosives states:

(translated) General permits for any of the activities regulated in this title, include the authorization for the transport within national territory, of firearms, objects and materials authorized, but their holders must abide by relevant laws, rules and regulation.

Under this clause, anyone intending to transport a firearm outside their home must first obtain the appropriate permit from SEDENA. Those who belong to hunting and/or shooting clubs and keep registered firearms for those purposes must maintain a valid permit (renewable every year) to remove the weapons from their home to the location of relevant activities. Even those who move to a new home address must not only notify SEDENA of the change of address but must also obtain a permit to transport the weapon from the current residence to the new one. Without the appropriate transportation permit, it is illegal to transport a firearm outside the home on your person or vehicle, even if lawfully registered, unloaded and in a locked container.

=== Taking firearms into Mexico ===
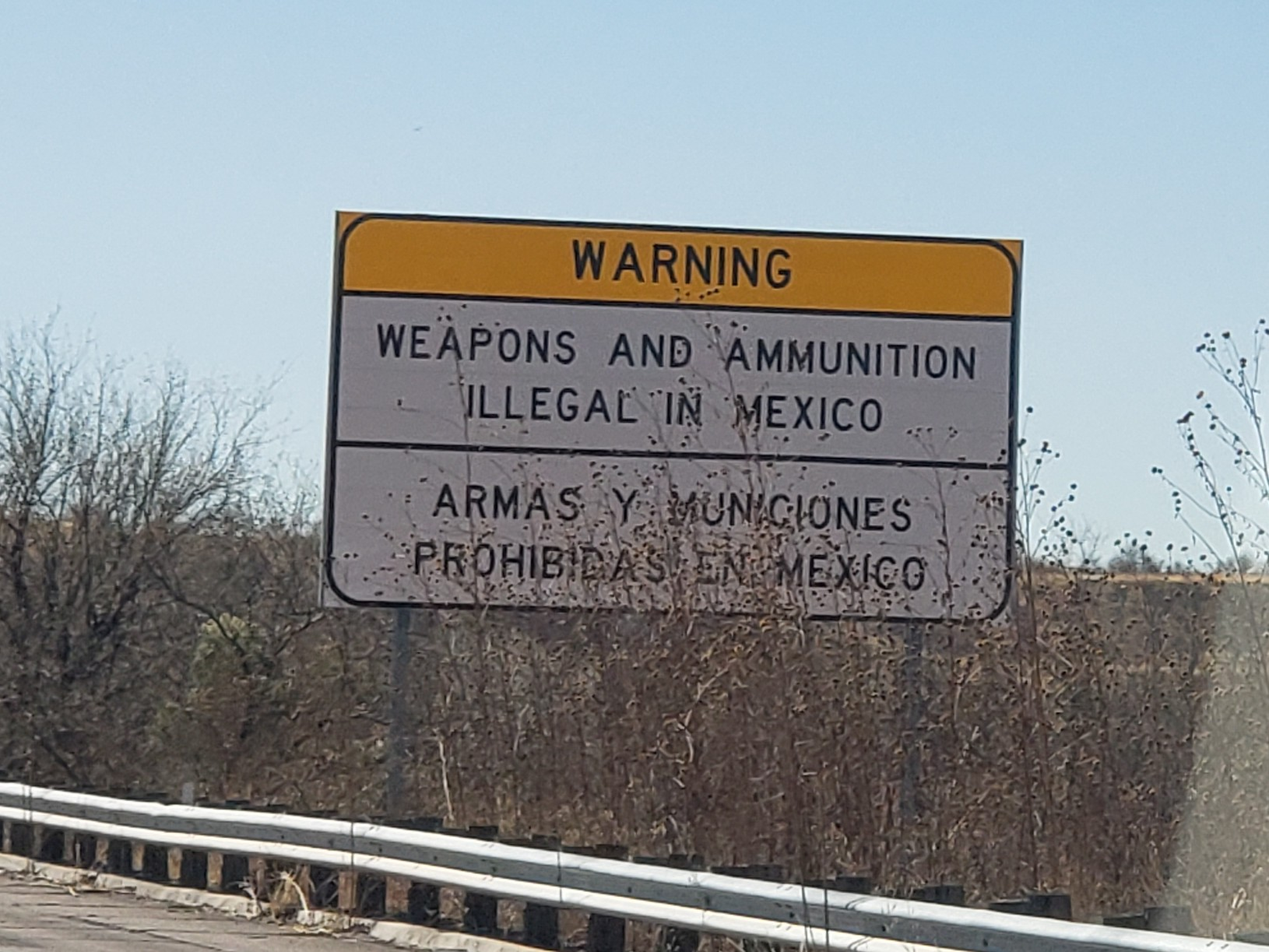
A sign in Nogales, Arizona warning against bringing weapons into Mexico

In regard to bringing firearms to Mexico, Title III, Chapter III, Article 55 of the Federal Law of Firearms and Explosives states:

(translated) Weapons, objects and materials referred in this law imported under ordinary or extraordinary permits, must be destined precisely to the use stated in given permits. Any modification, change or transformation different from the stated purpose, requires a new permit.

Additionally, Title III, Chapter III, Article 59 of the Federal Law of Firearms and Explosives states:

(translated) Temporary import and export of firearms and ammunition for hunting and shooting sport tourists, must be vested by the appropriate extraordinary permit, which shall indicate the conditions that must be met in accordance to the regulation of this law.

Under these articles, those who intend to engage in hunting and shooting sport activities in Mexico, must first obtain the required temporary import permit from the Secretariat of National Defense prior to traveling to Mexico.

Similarly, it is possible for Mexican citizens who reside in Mexico and foreign legal residents of Mexico (FM2 holders) to import a firearm into Mexico for their security and legitimate defense, under the types and calibers permitted for home defense and after receiving the appropriate import permit from the Secretariat of National Defense. Whoever intends to import a firearm to Mexico must be able to legally acquire the firearm outside of the country. For example, a US citizen who lawfully resides in Mexico as a FM2 holder or who holds dual nationality could purchase a firearm in the United States and request permission to import the weapon to Mexico. People eligible to legally purchase a firearm in the United States and eligible to reside in Mexico are allowed to import the weapon.

The U.S. Department of State warns US citizens [and all persons regardless of citizenship] against taking any firearm or ammunition into Mexico without prior written authorization from the Mexican authorities. Entering Mexico with a firearm, or even a single round of ammunition, carries a penalty of up to five years in prison, even if the firearm or ammunition is taken into the country unintentionally. Even if the weapon is lawfully registered in one's name in the U.S. (or any other country of residence) and even when the weapon falls under the types and calibers permitted for civilian ownership in Mexico, unless the bearer has explicit authorization from the Secretariat of National Defense, it is illegal and punishable by law to enter Mexican territory with any firearm as well as to keep and carry any firearm on one's person or vehicle. These permits cannot be obtained at Mexican customs and immigration when entering Mexico, but must be obtained in advance and in possession of the bearer before any gun enters Mexico.

== Sales and ownership ==
Private ownership of firearms is restricted to the home only. Only Mexican citizens and foreign legal residents of Mexico (FM2 holders) may purchase and keep firearms in their place of residence. The Directorate of Commercialization of Arms and Munitions (Dirección de Comercialización de Armamento y Municiones - DCAM) is the only outlet authorized to sell firearms and ammunition in the country and it is located in Mexico City near SEDENA's headquarters. The transfer of ownership and the sale and purchase of firearms between individuals is also permitted, but the transaction must receive authorization from the Secretariat of National Defense by both parties (buyer and seller) appearing in person along with the weapon, to conduct the transaction in accordance to requirements set by law.

=== Firearm activity authorized by law ===
There are generally five ways private citizens may lawfully purchase, register, own and keep firearms in the home:

1. For home defense (seguridad y legítima defensa)
2. For hunting (cacería)
3. For target practice (tiro)
4. For shooting sport competition (competencia)
5. For collection (colección)

For home defense, the government will authorize the sale and registration of one handgun of the types and calibers permitted by law.

For hunting, target practice or competition, the government will authorize the sale and registration of up to nine long guns (rifles or shotguns) and one handgun of the types and calibers permitted by law (must belong to a hunting and/or shooting club for these permits to be issued). Licensed sport hunting is allowed in a season and regulated by SEMARNAP (Secretariat of the Environment, Natural Resources, and Fisheries).

For collection, the government may authorize the sale and registration of an unlimited amount of firearms of any type and caliber in accordance to law and regulation.

=== Legal procedures to own a firearm ===
Private citizens wishing to acquire a firearm and ammunition are required by law to do the following:

1. Apply for a firearm acquisition permit from the General Directorate of the Federal Firearms Registry and Explosives Control (DGRFAFyCE) in the Secretariat of National Defense (SEDENA) either by mail or in person by submitting the following:
  1. (for Mexican citizens, males under 40) Copy of liberated National Military Service card; (for females or males over 40) certified birth certificate. Foreigners must provide documentation establishing legal presence (FM2 card),
  2. Proof of income by submitting original employment letter stating position, time of employment and salary. If self-employed or retired, proof of such status,
  3. Criminal background check showing no convictions, issued by the state's Attorney General where applicant resides (dated no older than six months),
  4. Copy of proof of address (any utility bill in name of applicant; if different, head of household must sign a letter authorizing firearms and ammunition in the home),
  5. Copy of government-issued photo identification (Voter ID Card if Mexican citizen, passport and FM2 card if foreign citizen),
  6. If weapons are requested for shooting or hunting, must submit copy of hunting and/or shooting club membership card, indicating day, month and year of the beginning and end of validation,
  7. Copy of birth certificate. Name(s) and last names must match all other documents, and
  8. Copy of the Unique Key of Population Registry (Clave Única de Registro de Población - CURP) Analogous to US social security card and number.
2. Upon being granted the firearm acquisition permit, fill out form and make payment of MX$95.00 (US$7.60) for Permit to Purchase Firearm, Accessories and/or Ammunition,
3. Fill out form and make payment of MX$39.00 (US$3.12) for Registration of Firearm (one form and payment per gun),
4. Contact the Directorate of Commercialization of Arms and Munitions (DCAM) by internet or in person to make payment of firearm.
5. With all receipts and documentation, along with photo ID, appear in person at DCAM to pick up firearm. A temporary transportation permit (valid for 24 to 72hrs) is granted, which permits the owner to transport the firearm from DCAM to his or her home by personal or public transportation (ground or air).

== Militia ==
Mexico has a history of various activities and insurrection by militia and paramilitary groups dating back several hundred years that include the exploits of historical figures such as Captain Manuel Pineda Munoz and Francisco "Pancho" Villa. This also includes groups such as the Free-Colored Militia (the interracial militias of New Spain, Colonial Mexico), the Camisas Doradas, and the contemporary Self Defense Council of Michoacan.

However some of the previous examples are historical, the current official view on the existence of such militias in Mexico, when are not backed by the government, has been always label them as illegal and to combat them in a military and a political way.

Modern examples on the Mexican view on militias are the Chiapas conflict against the EZLN and against the EPR in Guerrero, where the government forces combated the upraised militias. And in a more recent case when civilian self-defence militias appeared during the Mexican war on drugs, the government regulated them and transformed the militias in to Rural federal forces, and those who resisted were combated and imprisoned.

== See also ==
- Gun politics
- Smuggling of firearms into Mexico
- Law of Mexico
- Politics of Mexico
- Index of gun politics articles
