= Roque González Garza =

President of Mexico in 1915

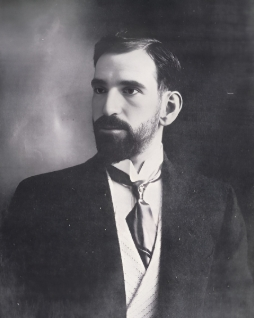

42nd President of Mexico by the Convention of Aguascalientes (Note: After the ousting of President Huerta, Venustiano Carranza formed the Constitutional Army, while the forces of Pancho Villa and Emiliano Zapata held the Convention of Aguascalientes and appointed three men to serve as President, with González Garza being the second. When President Lagos Cházaro resigned, the string of Conventionalist presidents ended and the conflict continued, and from 1915 to 1917 there technically was no president. The United States ultimately recognized Carranza as the legitimate leader of Mexico after the creation of the Constitution of 1917 and Carranza's victory in the election of 1917.)
- In office 16 January – 9 June 1915
- Vice President: Vacant (Note: After the ousting of President Madero and Vice President Pino Suárez, constitutional Presidents Lascuráin, Huerta, and Carvajal, did not appoint vice presidents, as they were not elected. This continued with the Conventionalists, including González Garza. The Vice Presidency was eventually abolished by the Constitution of 1917.)
- Preceded by: Eulalio Gutiérrez
- Succeeded by: Francisco Lagos Cházaro

Member of the Chamber of Deputies for the Federal District's 8th district
- In office 1 September 1922 – 31 August 1924

Member of the Chamber of Deputies for Coahuila's 1st district
- In office 16 September 1912 – 10 October 1913
- Preceded by: Rafael Ramos Arizpe

Jefe Supremo of the Acción Revolucionaria Mexicanista
- In office 1933–1934
- Succeeded by: Nicolás Rodríguez Carrasco

Personal details
- Born: Roque Victoriano González Garza; 23 March 1885 Saltillo, Coahuila
- Died: 12 November 1962 (aged 77) Mexico City

Roque Victoriano González Garza (March 23, 1885 – November 12, 1962) was a Mexican general and politician who served as acting President of Mexico from January to June 1915. He was appointed by the Convention of Aguascalientes during the Mexican Revolution, and had previously been an important advisor to President Francisco Madero and a member of the Chamber of Deputies. He was later a founder of the anti-communist, xenophobic, antisemitic, nationalist Revolutionary Mexicanist Action party and its leader from 1933 to 1934.

== Early years in politics ==
From 1908 he appeared in politics in opposition to the government of President Porfirio Díaz. He was one of the first supporters of Francisco I. Madero, whom he accompanied in his presidential campaign. He was director of revolutionary forces in Coahuila, and a federal deputy. During the election of 1910, Díaz had Madero (the opposition candidate) and 6,000 of his supporters jailed. González was arrested with Madero. Madero was able to escape and issued a call for armed revolt. González later joined him and fought in the battles of Casas Grandes and Ciudad Juárez.

After Madero assumed the presidency, González was his personal assistant and a member of his general staff. When Madero and Vice-President José María Pino Suárez were murdered, González went to the north, joining the forces of Francisco Villa. He was promoted to general and he participated in the most important battles of the revolution against the Huerta regime. These included the battles of Torreón, San Pedro de las Colonias, Paredón, Saltillo and Zacatecas.

== Federal positions ==
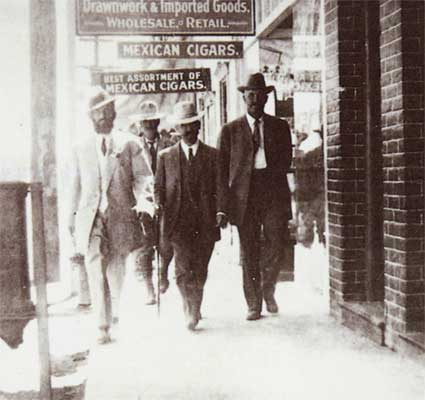
Roque González (left) and Francisco I. Madero (center) while exiled in San Antonio, Texas.

He was the personal representative of Villa in the Aguascalientes Convention, where he was one of the most outstanding figures. He was chosen to preside at the Convention, and was one of the editors of the Manifiesto that the Convention published on November 13, 1914.

On the fall of Conventionalist President Eulalio Gutiérrez, he was chosen by the Convention as Gutiérrez's replacement. As a Conventionalist, he was in opposition to the Constitutionalist president, Venustiano Carranza. González's term of office ran from January 16, 1915, to June 9 of the same year. On the latter date, by agreement of the Convention, he turned over power to Francisco Lagos Cházaro and reentered private life in Mexico City.

The victory of the Constitutionalists forced him into exile, where he remained several years, until after the death of Carranza. Years later he collaborated in the administration of General Manuel Ávila. He was coauthor of the books La Batalla de Torreón (1914) and Apuntes para la Historia (1914), which recounted the events of the Mexican Revolution.

== Revolutionary Mexicanist Action ==
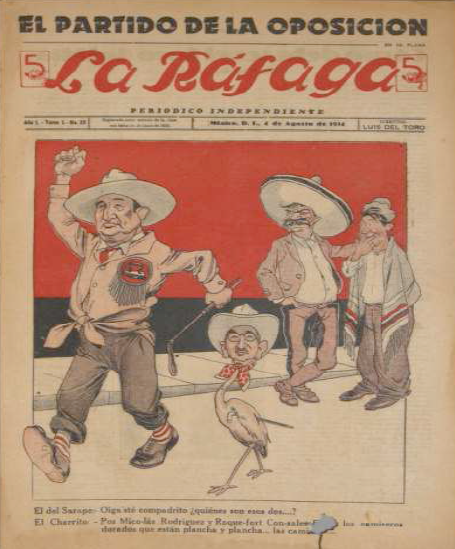
Caricature of Nicolas Rodriguez Carrasco and Roque Gonzalez Garza on the front page of a communist magazine

In 1933, González Garza co-founded the fascist paramilitary Revolutionary Mexicanist Action along with many other militants of the Mexican Revolution. He led the paramilitary group until 1934 where he was succeeded by Nicolas Rodriguez Carrasco. Although no longer leader, he maintained his prominence in the group. In March 1935, González Garza and Ovidio Pedrero Valenzuela led the group on horseback raiding and destroying the newly established Mexican Communist Party headquarters in Mexico City.

== Later life and death ==
During the presidency of Manuel Ávila Camacho, he held governmental positions.

He was awarded the rank of major general, was president of the Legion of Honor. In 1962, President Adolfo López Mateos appointed him head of works in Meztitlán, Hidalgo.

González Garza wrote books on the history of the revolution.

Roque González Garza died in Mexico City on November 12, 1962.

== See also ==
- List of heads of state of Mexico

== Bibliography ==
- "González Garza, Roque", Enciclopedia de México, vol. 6. Mexico City, 1996, ISBN 1-56409-016-7.
- García Puron, Manuel, México y sus gobernantes, v. 2. Mexico City: Joaquín Porrúa, 1984.
- Orozco Linares, Fernando, Gobernantes de México. Mexico City: Panorama Editorial, 1985, ISBN 968-38-0260-5.

Political offices
Preceded by Eulalio Gutiérrez	President of Mexico; 1915	Succeeded by Francisco Lagos Cházaro
