= Nicolás Rodríguez Carrasco =

Founder of the Revolutionary Mexicanist Action

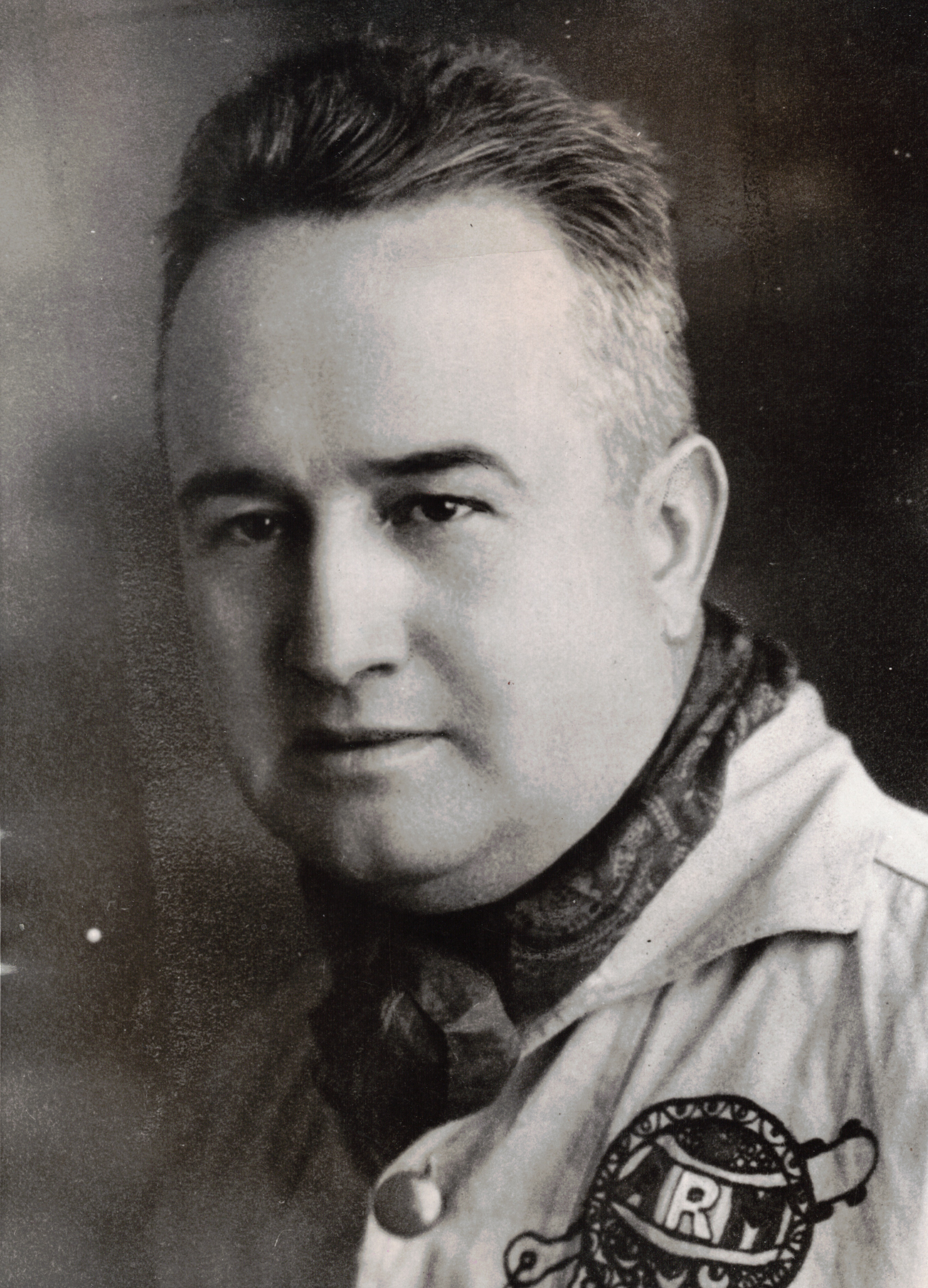
- Rodríguez Carrasco's Revolutionary Mexicanist Action portrait, circa 1934
- Born: 1890; Chihuahua, Chihuahua, Mexico
- Died: August 11, 1940 (aged 49 or 50); Mexico
- Years active: 1923–1938
- Known for: Co-founder and Leader of Revolutionary Mexicanist Action
- Spouse: Leonor Gutiérrez
- Military career
- Allegiance: División del Norte (1911–1914); Carrancistas (1914–1918)
- Service years: 1911 — 1918
- Rank: Brigadier general

Jefe Supremo of the Acción Revolucionaria Mexicanista
- In office 1934–1940
- Preceded by: Roque González Garza

Nicolás Rodríguez Carrasco (1890 – August 11, 1940) was a Mexican general, revolutionary, and the founder and leader of the fascist paramilitary organization Revolutionary Mexicanist Action, better known as the Gold Shirts.

Throughout his life, Rodríguez Carrasco took part in multiple rebellions against Mexican governments. By the 1930s, he had become an admirer of Adolf Hitler and campaigned through his paramilitary group to expel Jews, Chinese, and communists from Mexico. His Gold Shirts organization was largely supported and protected by Plutarco Elías Calles as both Calles and Rodríguez Carrasco were staunch opponents of the 1934–1940 Cárdenas government. After Calles's exile in 1935 and the subsequent loss of his protection, Rodríguez Carrasco was expelled from Mexico in August 1936.

During his second exile in Texas, Rodríguez Carrasco and the Revolutionary Mexicanist Action planned a coup against the Mexican government. Planning and preparations were largely funded by fascist organizations based in Europe as well as by Texan oil tycoons and COPARMEX following the Mexican oil expropriation. On January 31, 1938, insurgents launched an attack on the city of Matamoros, Tamaulipas, but were quickly thwarted by the Mexican national guard.

== Early life ==
Rodríguez Carrasco was born in the city of Chihuahua. His father was a Carrancista during the Mexican Revolution before joining the Northern Division. At a very young age, he met and established a very close friendship with Pancho Villa. On more than one occasion, Rodríguez Carrasco hid Villa in his parents' house to evade capture by rurales.

In a statement given by Rodríguez Carrasco in 1912, he met Villa as a young boy. Villa was a friend of the Rodríguez family. Villa was a cattle dealer at a Chihuahua slaughterhouse and often visited the grocery store Rodríguez Carrasco worked at. Villa would often lend Rodríguez Carrasco his horse for recreational rides as well as attended cockfights together.

Rodríguez Carrasco had many brothers who supported his paramilitary endeavors, notably José, Joaquín, and Manuel.

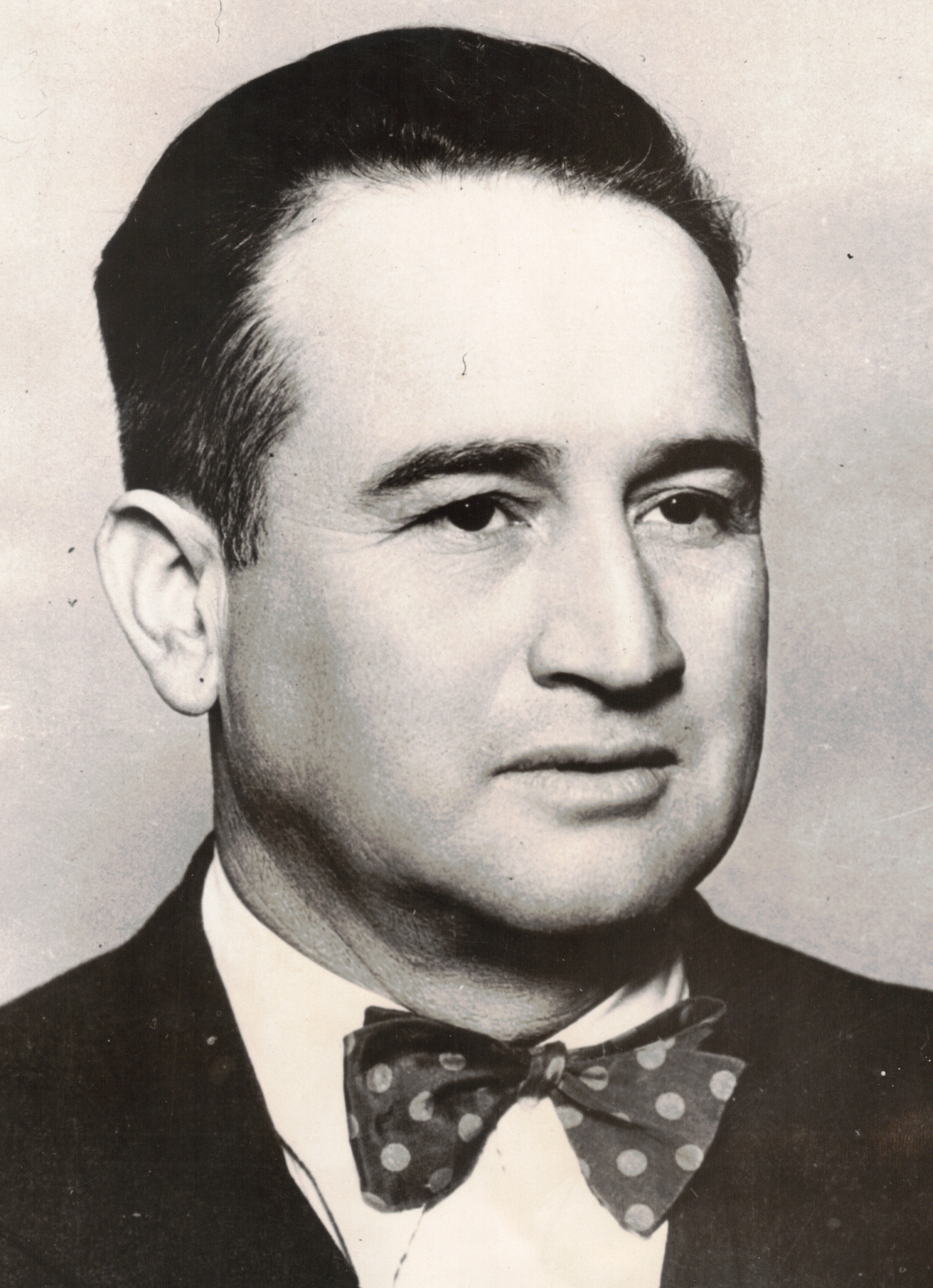
Nicolás Rodríguez Carrasco in his youth, year unknown

== Mexican Revolution ==
Rodríguez Carrasco joined the ranks of Pancho Villa in the División del Norte when the Mexican Revolution broke out. He eventually reached the rank of brigadier general.

During the Convention of Aguascalientes, Rodríguez Carrasco had a violent altercation with Villa. To avoid execution, he joined the Carrancistas where he stayed until his desertion in 1918.

== Early rebellions and first exile ==
In 1923, Rodríguez Carrasco took part in the failed coup d'etat led by Enrique Estrada known as the Delahuertista Rebellion. For his part in the plot, he was exiled to El Paso, Texas, in 1924. Rodríguez Carrasco spent a couple years doing odd jobs, all the while conspiring against the Mexican government.

In 1926, he moved to Los Angeles where Enrique Estrada had once again been plotting a takeover of Baja California. Headed by Estrada, a group of former Mexican generals, including Rodríguez Carrasco, would attempt to overthrow governor Abelardo L. Rodríguez and spark a national rebellion against Plutarco Elías Calles. The preparation of the plot caught the attention of Bureau of Investigation. On August 15, when Estrada's caravans approached San Diego, federal agents thwarted the plot arresting 150 people including Rodríguez Carrasco. He was found guilty in February 1927 and spent 1 year, 1 month, and 1 day at McNeil Island Corrections Center.

Following his release from prison in March 1928, he once again relocated to Los Angeles and became an editor for El Informador. He held this position for a short time before moving back to Mexico.

== Return to Mexico ==
Rodríguez Carrasco returned to Chihuahua on the recommendation of fellow general Rodrigo M. Quevedo to the governor of Chihuahua. Quevedo attempted to create a Revolutionary Fair in Ciudad Juárez commemorating the Mexican Revolution. Many revolutionary figures and militants were contacted, including Rodríguez Carrasco, however the fair never came into fruition. He managed to receive about 20,000 pesos through political donations as a result of the fair perpetrations. Shortly after his return, he became politically involved with many far-right organizations.

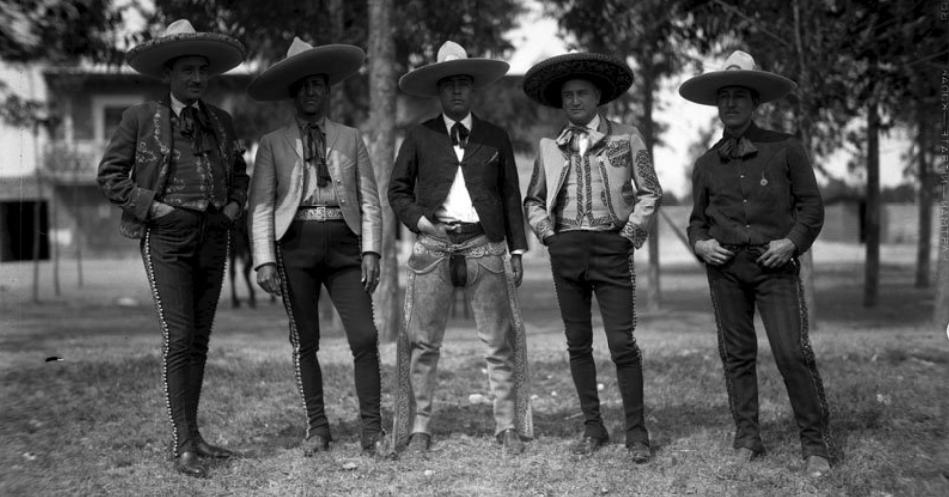
Rodríguez Carrasco (second from right) in 1931 or 1932.

During 1928 and 1929, Rodríguez Carrasco campaigned for José Vasconcelos's presidential bid for the 1929 presidential election. The election was rigged against Vasconcelos's favor and subsequently unsuccessfully attempted to garner military support to overthrow the government.

In 1929, Rodríguez Carrasco once again took part in a rebellion against the Mexican government headed by José Gonzalo Escobar known as the Escobar Rebellion.

Sometime after 1929, Rodríguez Carrasco became a strikebreaker under the protection of Calles.

In 1931 Rodríguez Carrasco joined a far-right and sinophobic organization called the Pro-race Committee.

In 1932, Rodríguez Carrasco formed the Camisas Verdes, a paramilitary group which was characterized as anti-communist, anti-union, and ultranationalist. At gatherings, members would chant "Mexico for Mexicans". The group actively antagonized strikers and targeted Chinese-owned businesses. The organization was protected and support of Plutarco Elías Calles. The group was disbanded by Abelardo Rodríguez shortly after taking power in September 1932.

== Revolutionary Mexicanist Action ==
=== Foundation ===
Rodríguez Carrasco, along with various other ex-military veterans, founded the paramilitary group Revolutionary Mexicanist Action (Spanish: Acción Revolucionaria Mexicanista), also known as the Gold Shirts (Spanish: Camisas Doradas) or A.R.M. on September 25, 1933. The organization mainly consisted of many former generals and soldiers who fought under Pancho Villa. The group was protected and supported by Calles like Rodríguez Carrasco's previous organization. The organization called to expel the Jews and Chinese from Mexico in "defense of national interests". In 1934, he was given the title of Supreme Chief of the Gold Shirts.

A fervent Hitler sympathizer, he would express the following:

Hitler, an insignificant ex-soldier of the world war, but a man of clear vision and an unsuspected love for his homeland; he took in at a glance the great problem of the Jewish danger, matured his plans, and when he found himself master of Germany, he bravely faced the situation and expelled without mercy, in a brilliant and audacious act, all the Jews residing in the Reich.

==== 1935 Revolution Day Riot ====
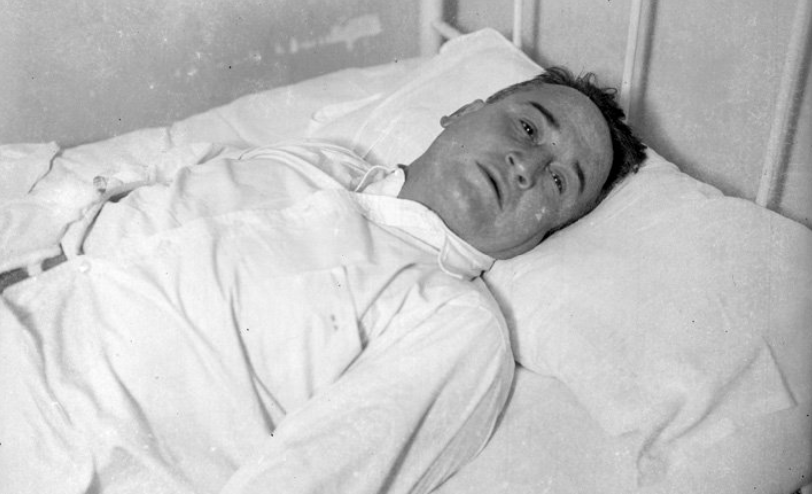
Rodriguez Carrasco in the hospital for the wounds he received during the riot.

Tensions between Calles and president Lázaro Cárdenas rose with the latter increasing the suppression efforts of the Gold Shirts. On November 20, 1935, a violent clash between communists and the Gold Shirts during the Revolution Day parade at the Zócalo resulted in 3 deaths and more than 40 injuries of which included Rodríguez Carrasco. Rodríguez Carrasco was stabbed twice in the abdomen and left critically injured.

The incident sparked nation-wide public outrage against the Revolutionary Mexicanist Action. The Senate sought to ban the organization a day after the riots. Public protests were held against the group and their union busting activities with President Cárdenas receiving an overwhelming amount of requests to have the organization banned.

== Second exile ==
On February 27, 1936, Cárdenas ordered the dissolution of the group. On August 11, Rodríguez Carrasco was arrested and set to be expelled from the country. He was arrested in Pachuca where was driven to an airport and flown to Ciudad Juárez then to El Paso, Texas. Following his exile, he was considered a non-threat by the Mexican government.

Throughout his time in exile, Rodríguez Carrasco continued to draft various manifestos against the Mexican government, Jews, communists, and President Cárdenas in The McAllen Monitor.

Rodríguez Carrasco moved to Laredo, Texas, with his wife, Leonor Gutiérrez. Shortly thereafter, he met young woman named Emilia Herron who belonged to a very wealthy family El Paso. They developed an affair and Rodríguez Carrasco divorced Gutiérrez. Rodríguez Carrasco contacted immigration services to have Gutiérrez deported back to Mexico. A distraught Gutiérrez brought with her a great volume of documents containing sensitive information about the Revolutionary Mexicanist Action. She notified the police of Mexico City of Rodríguez Carrasco's activities. She made many public declarations regarding the organization's activities against the government and named many public figures who supported the paramilitary group. This caused serious internal conflicts within the organization where some members of the group stopped supporting Rodríguez Carrasco.

=== Rebellion plot ===
Since at least 1935, the organization had been plotting a rebellion against the government. Carlos Walterio Steinman, a former colonel in the Mexican Army living in New York, told Rodríguez Carrasco he had raised over 4 million dollars to help in a "change of government" in a letter dated July 3, 1935.

Rodríguez Carrasco established a Revolutionary Mexicanist Action headquarters in Mission, Texas. Rodríguez Carrasco approached wealthy Texan oilmen whose assets in Mexico were negatively affected by worker strikes and government policies for funds. Other donors he personally received funds from included Reverend P.L. Delgado, William H. Wood, and a wealthy farmer only known as Smithers. Rodríguez Carrasco also received funds to purchase armament from his very close friend and former governor of San Luis Potosí, Saturnino Cedillo. Cedillo, by 1937, had grievances with Cárdenas and alleged ties to German Nazis. Cedillo also had several private meetings with members of the Revolutionary Mexicanist Action.

By March 1937, Rodríguez Carrasco was receiving $2000 to $3000 a month in donations from American and Mexican nationals alike for the Revolutionary Mexicanist Action. The money was given to contacts that would regularly travel from Brownsville and Nogales. Rodríguez Carrasco also met with Henry Allen in 1937. Allen was a prominent figure of an American antisemitic fascist group known as the Silver Legion. Allen offered Rodríguez Carrasco protection and both directly received funds from the Nazi Party.

=== 1938 January Rebellion ===
The Mexican Government had received various reports on Rodríguez Carrasco's plot and purchases of weapons. On January 31, 1938, the rebellion was launched in Tamaulipas, where troops had been already dispatched at the request of Tamaulipas governor Marte R. Gómez. Three Gold Shirts members and one police officer were killed in a day of fighting.

Historian Alicia Gojman de Backal opined that the rebellions largely failed in part of Rodríguez Carrasco's inability to attract a large number of followers as his movement fundamentally did not appeal to the masses. As nationalization of the oil industry proved to be beneficial and popular to the majority of the population, very few, especially people of the lower and middle class, opposed it.

== Illness and death ==
Sometime between late 1939 and early 1940, Rodríguez Carrasco developed aplastic anemia. In February 1940, an informant to the Mexican government with close contact with Rodríguez Carrasco reported he had contracted typhoid fever and traveled to a sanatorium in Chicago. The informant also claimed Rodríguez Carrasco at this time had become difficult to recognize citing significant weight loss and newfound usage of glasses. No longer politically motivated, Rodríguez Carrasco requested a pardon from Cárdenas to be allowed to return to Mexico, citing his terminal illness. He was granted amnesty and moved into his mother's house on the 5 August. He died six days later on August 11 from his illness.

== Personal life ==
Rodríguez Carrasco was married to Leonor Gutiérrez who was head of the women's Revolutionary Mexicanist Action faction. The couple divorced in 1937 following an affair Rodríguez Carrasco had while in exile.

Rodríguez Carrasco had many siblings. A few of his brothers were members of the Revolutionary Mexicanist Action, notably José, Joaquín, and Manuel.

=== Beliefs ===
Nicolás Rodríguez Carrasco's anti-Semitic and anti-communist sentiments were greatly influenced by Arthur Dietrich.

== Historical disputes ==
=== Parents ===
The names of Rodríguez Carrasco's parents officially remain unknown. The name of his father was possibly Trinidad Rodríguez, originally hailing from Huejotitán, Chihuahua. His mother is thought to have been named Guadalupe.

=== Age ===
Despite historians' best search efforts, Rodríguez Carrasco's birth certificate has not been found. His year of birth is estimated to be 1890; he was approximately aged 44 when he assumed leadership of the Revolutionary Mexicanist Action in 1934.

Rodríguez Carrasco birthyear was placed in 1897 in Biographical Dictionary of the Extreme Right Since 1890 by Philip Rees.

=== Death ===
There are many conflicting reports on the location of death of Rodríguez Carrasco. Following his death, different news sources stated he had died in Mission or El Paso, Texas. Other sources stated he had died in his mother's house with the location reported to be in Chihuahua, Reynosa, and Ciudad Juárez. The historical consensus is Rodríguez Carrasco had in fact died in his mother's house in northern Mexico while all sources report his death occurring on August 11.
