= Calle de República de Guatemala =

Street in Mexico City

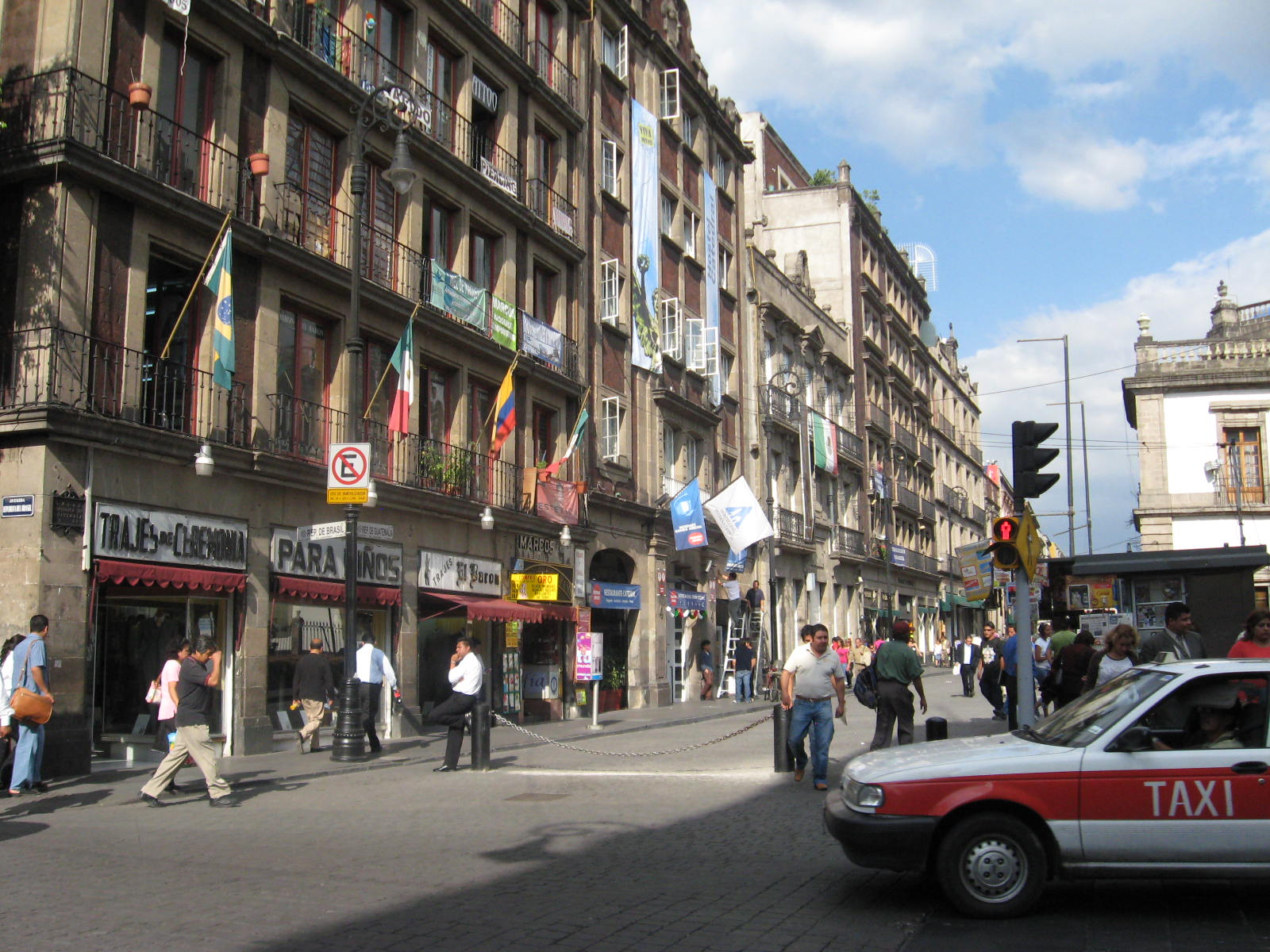
- View of Calle de República de Guatemala.
- Location: Mexico City, Mexico
- Nearest metro station: Zócalo/Tenochtitlan

Calle de República de Guatemala is a street located in the historic center of Mexico City. It is named after the country of Guatemala, a name it received in 1921.

Museo Archivo de la Fotografía is located in this street.
