= List of neighborhoods in Mexico City =

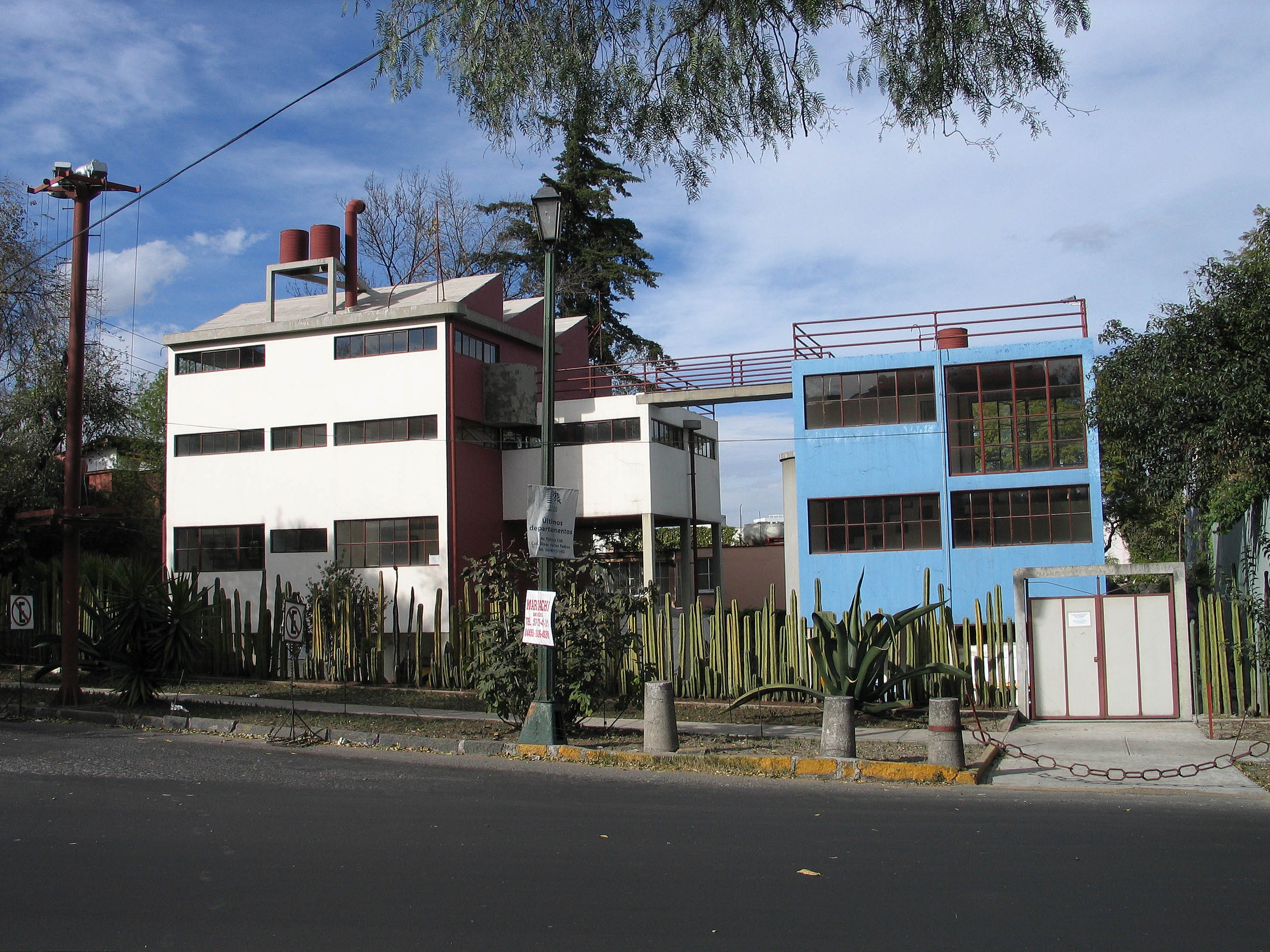
San Ángel

In Mexico, the neighborhoods of large metropolitan areas are known as colonias. One theory suggests that the name, which literally means colony, arose in the late 19th and early 20th centuries, when one of the first urban developments outside Mexico City's core was built by a French immigrant colony. Unlike neighborhoods in the United States, colonias in Mexico City have a specific name which is used in all official documents and postal addresses. Usually, colonias are assigned a specific postal code; nonetheless, in recent urban developments, gated communities are also defined as colonias, yet they share the postal code with adjacent neighborhoods. When writing a postal address the name of the colonia must be specified after the postal code and preceding the name of the city. For example:

Calle Dakota 145
Colonia Nápoles
Alc. Benito Juárez
03810 Ciudad de México

Some of the better known colonias include:

- Bosques de las Lomas - Upscale residential neighborhood and business center.
- Centro - Covers the historic downtown (centro histórico) of Mexico City.
- Condesa - Twenties post-Revolution neighborhood.
- Roma - Beaux Arts neighbourhood next to Condesa, one of the oldest in Mexico City.
- Colonia Juarez - includes the Zona Rosa area, a gay friendly shopping area
- Coyoacán - Town founded by Cortés swallowed by the city in the 1950s, countercultural neighborhood in downtown.
- Del Valle - Upscale residential neighborhood and cradle of José López Portillo and many other important people in Mexican history.
- Jardines del Pedregal - Upscale residential neighborhood with works notable architect by Luis Barragán
- Lomas de Chapultepec - Upscale residential neighborhood and business center
- Nápoles - home of the World Trade Center Mexico City and the iconic Midcentury monument the Polyforum Cultural Siqueiros.
- San Ángel - Historic residential and shopping area.
- Santa Fe - Financial, business district and upscale residential neighborhood.
- Polanco - Shopping, business and tourist area.
- Tepito - Popular flea market, home to many boxers and street gangs.
- Tlatelolco - Site of the Plaza de las Tres Culturas. High-density neighborhood.

== List by borough ==
A list of colonias (neighborhoods) in Mexico City by borough:

=== Álvaro Obregón ===
2da del Moral del Pueblo Tetelpan • 2do Reacomodo Tlacuitlapa • 8 de Agusto • Abraham M. González • Acueducto • Acuilotla • Alcantarilla • Alfonso XIII • Altavista • Amp. Acueducto • Amp. Alpes • Amp. El Capulín • Amp. Estado de Hidalgo • Amp. Jalalpa • Amp. La Cebada • Amp. La Mexicana • Amp. Las Águilas • Amp. Los Pirules • Amp. Piloto Adolfo López Mateos • Amp. Tepeaca • Amp. Tlacuitlapa • Arcos Centenario • Arturo Martínez • Árvide • Atlamaya • Ave Real • Balcones de Cehuaya • Barrio Alfalfar • Barrio La Otra Banda • Barrio Loreto • Barrio Norte • Barrio Santa María Nonoalco • Bejero del Pueblo de Santa Fe • Belén de las Flores • Bellavista • Bonanza • Bosque • Calzada Jalapa • Campestre • Campo de los Tiros • Cañada 1a Secc. • Cañada 2a Secc. • Canutillo 2a Secc. • Canutillo 3a Secc. • Canutillo • Carlos A. Madrazo • Carola • Cehuaya • Chimalistac • Colina del Sur • Colinas de Tarango • Cooperativa Unión Olivos • Corpus Christi • Cove • Cristo Rey • Cuevitas • Desarollo Urbano • Dos Ríos del Pueblo de Santa Lucía • Ejido San Mateo • El Árbol • El Capulin • El Cuernito • El Mirador del Pueblo Tetelpan • El Pirul 2a Secc. • El Pirul Santa Fe • El Pirul • El Pocito • El Politoco • El Rincón • El Rodeo • El Ruedo • El Tecojote • Encino del Pueblo Tetelpan • Ermita Tizapán • Estado de Hidalgo • Ex-Hacienda de Guadalupe Chimalistac • Ex-Hacienda Tarango • Flor de María • Florida • Francisco Villa • Galeana • Garcimarrero • Golondrinas 1a Secc. • Golondrinas 2a Secc. • Golondrinas • Guadalupe Inn • Heron Proal • Hidalgo • Hogar y Redención • Hueytlale • Industrias Militares de Sedena • Isidora Fabela • Jalalpa Tepito 2a Amp. • Jalalpa Tepito • Jalapa el Grande • Jardines del Pedregal • José María Pino Suárez • La Angostura • La Araña • La Cascada • La Conchita • La Estrella • La Herradura del Pueblo Tetelpan • La Huerta • La Joya • La Joyita del Pueblo Tetelpan • La Loma • La Martinica • La Mexicana 2a Amp. • La Mexicana • La Milagrosa • La Palmita • La Peñita del Pueblo Tetelpan • La Presa • Ladera • Las Águilas 1a Secc. • Las Águilas 2do Secc. Parque • las Águilas 3a Secc. Parque • Las Águilas • Las Américas • Liberación Proletaria • Liberales de 1857 • Llano Redondo • Lomas Axomiatla • Lomas de Becerra • Lomas de Cápula • Lomas de Chamontoya • Lomas de Guadalupe • Lomas de la Era • Lomas de las Águilas • Lomas de los Ángeles del Pueblo Tetelpan • Lomas de los Cedros • Lomas de Nuevo México • Lomas de Plateros • Lomas de Puerta Grande • Lomas de San Ángel Inn • Lomas de Santa Fe • Lomas de Tarango • Los Alpes • Los Cedros • Los Gamitos • Los Juristas • Margarita Masa de Juárez • María G. de García Ruiz • Mártires de Tacubaya • Merced Gómez • Miguel Gaona Armenta • Miguel Hidalgo • Minas Cristo Rey • Molino de Rosas • Molino de Santo Domingo • Ocotillos del Pueblo Tetelpan • Olivar de los Padres • Olivar del Conde 1a Secc. • Olivar del Conde 2a Secc. • Palmas Axotitla • Palmas Axotitla • Palmas • Paraíso • Paseo de las Lomas • Piloto Adolfo López Mateos • Pirul Santa Lucía • Pólvora • Ponciano Arriaga • Preconcreto • Presidentes 1a Secc. • Presidentes 2a Secc. • Presidentes • Primera Victoria • Professor J. Arturo López Martínez • Progreso Tizapán • Pueblo Axotla • Pueblo Nuevo • Pueblo San Bartolo Ameyalco • Pueblo Santa Fe • Pueblo Santa Lucía Chantepec • Pueblo Santa Lucía • Pueblo Santa Rosa Xochiac • Pueblo Tetelpan • Pueblo Tizapán • Pueblo Tlacopac • Puente Colorado • Puerta Grande • Punto de Cehuaya • Punto de Cehuaya • Rancho del Carmen del Pueblo San Bartolo Ameyalco • Rancho San Francisco del Pueblo San Bartolo Ameyalco • Reacamodo El Cuernito • Reacomodo Pino Suárez • Reacomodo Valentín Gómez Farías • Real del Monte • Rincón de la Bolsa • Rinconada de Tarango • Rinconada La Cuevita • Sacramento • San Ángel • San Ángel Inn • San Augustín del Pueblo Tetelpan • San Clemente Norte • San Clemente Sur • San Gabriel • San Jerónimo Aculco • San José del Olivar • San Pedro de los Pinos • Santa Fe Centro Ciudad • Santa Fe la Loma • Santa Fe la Loma • Santa Fe Peña Blanca • Santa Fe Tlayapaca • Santa Fe • Santa Lucía Chantepec • Tarango • Tecalcapa del Pueblo Tetelpan • Tecolalco • Tepeaca • Tepopotla • Tizampampano del Pueblo Tetelpan • Tlacoyaque • Tlacuitlapa • Tlacuitlapa • Tlapechico • Tolteca • Torres de Potrero • Torres de Potrero • Villa Progresista • Villa Solidaridad • Villa Verdún • Zenón Delgado

=== Azcapotzalco ===
Aguilera • Aldana • Amp. Cosmopolita • Amp. del Gas • Amp. Petrolera • Amp. San Pedro Xalpa • Ángel Zimbrón • Arenal • Barrio de Huautla de Las Salinas • Barrio San Andrés • Barrio San Sebastián • Centro de Azcapotzalco • Clavería • Coltongo • Cosmopolita • del Gas • del Maestro • del Recreo • El Jagüey • Estación Pantaco • Euzkadi • Ferrería • Hacienda del Rosario • Hogar y Seguridad • Ignacio Allende • Industrial Vallejo • ISSS Fam Las Armas • Jardín Azpeitia • La Preciosa • La Raza • Las Salinas • Liberación • Libertad • Los Reyes • Monte Alto • Nextengo • Nueva España • Nuevo Rosario • Nuevo San Rafael • Nuevo Santa Maria • Obrero Popular • Panteón San Isidro • Pasteros • Petrolera • Petrolera • Plenitud • Porvenir • Potrero del Llano • Prados del Rosario • Pro Hogar • Providencia • Pueblo Quieto • Pueblo San Andres de las Salinas • Pueblo Santa Bárbara • Pueblo Santa María Malinalco • Reynosa Tamaulipas • San Álvaro • San Antonio • San Bartolo Cacahualtongo • San Bernabé • San Francisco Tetecala • San Francisco Xocotitla • San Juan Tlihuaca • San Marcos • San Martín Xochinahuac • San Mateo • San Miguel Amantla • San Pedro Xalpa • San Rafael • San Salvador Xochimanco • Santa Apolonia • Santa Catarina • Santa Cruz Acuyacan • Santa Cruz de las Salinas • Santa Inés • Santa Lucía • Santiago Ahuizotla • Santo Domingo • Santo Domingo II • Santo Tomás • Sindicato Mexicano de Electricistas • Tezozómoc • Tierra Nueva • Tlatilco • Trabajadores del Hierro • U. H. Azcapotzalco • U. H. Campo Encantado • U. H. Cruz Roja Tepatongo • U. H. El Rosario • U. H. Francisco Villa • U. H. La Escuadra • U. H. Las Trancas • U. H. Lázaro Cárdenas • U. H. Lerdo de Tejada • U. H. Miguel Hidalgo • U. H. Presidente Madero • U. H. Rinconada • U. H. Rosendo Salazar • U. H. San Isidro • U. H. San Juan Tlihuaca • U. H. San Pablo Xalpa • U. H. Trabajadores de Pemex • U. H. Villas Azcapotzalco • U.H. Cobre de México • U.H. Cuitláhuac • U.H. Jardines de Ceylán • Un Hogar para cada trabajador • Victoria de las Democracias

=== Benito Juárez ===
8 de Agosto • Acacias • Actipán • Álamos • Albert • Amp. Nápoles • Américas Unidas • Atenor Salas • Ciudad de los Deportes • Crédito Constructor • Del Carmen • Del Lago • Del Valle Centro • Del Valle Norte • Del Valle Sur • Ermita • Extremadura Insurgentes • General Pedro María Anaya • Independencia • Insurgentes Mixcoac • Insurgentes San Borja • Iztaccíhuatl • Josefa Ortiz de Domínguez • Letrán Valle • Merced Gómez • Miguel Alemán • Miravalle • Mixcoac • Moderna • Nápoles • Narvarte Oriente • Narvarte Poniente • Nativitas • Niños Héroes • Noche Buena • Nápoles • Periodista • Piedad Narvarte • Portales Norte • Portales Oriente • Portales Sur • Postal • Residencial Emperadores • San José Insurgentes • San Juan • San Pedro de los Pinos • San Simón Ticumac • Santa Cruz Atoyac • Santa María Nonoalco • Tlacoquemécatl • Villa de Cortés • Vértiz Narvarte • Xoco • Zacahuitzco

=== Coyoacán ===
Adolfo Ruíz Cortínez • Ajusco • Alianza Popular Revolucionaria A • Alianza Popular Revolucionaria B • Alianza Popular Revolucionaria C • Alianza Popular Revolucionaria D • Alianza Popular Revolucionaria Norte • Ampliación Candelaria • Ampliación San Francisco Culhuacán • Atlántida • Avante • Barrio de la Purísima Concepción • Barrio de Oxtopulco • Barrio de San Diego and Barrio de San Mateo Churubusco (in practice, these two neighborhoods are considered as two; however, they are considered as only one from an administrative point of view) • Barrio de San Lucas • Barrio de Santa Catarina • Barrio del Cuadrante de San Francisco • Barrio del Niño Jesús • Barrio Rancho el Rosario • Bosques de Tetlameya • C.T.M. Culhuacán Sec. I • C.T.M. Culhuacán Sec. II • C.T.M. Culhuacán Sec. III • C.T.M. Culhuacán Sec. IV • C.T.M. Culhuacán Sec. IX-A ("CTM" stands for "Confederación de Trabajadores de México", the name of the main union of workers in Mexico) • C.T.M. Culhuacán Sec. IX • C.T.M. Culhuacán Sec. VI • C.T.M. Culhuacán Sec. VII • C.T.M. Culhuacán Sec. VIII • C.T.M. Culhuacán Sec. X-A • C.T.M. Culhuacán Sec. X • Cafetales I • Cafetales II • Campestre Churubusco • Carmen Serdán • Centro Urbano Pedregal de Carrasco • Ciudad Jardín • Copilco Universidad ISSSTE • Copilco Universidad • Country Club • Del Carmen • Del Parque • Educación • Ejido de Santa Úrsula Coapa • El Caracol • El Centinela • El Mirador • El Reloj • El Rosedal • Emiliano Zapata • Espartaco • Ex Ejido De San Francisco Culhuacán • Fortín Chimalistac • Fracc. Campestre Coyoacán • Fracc. Cantil del Pedregal • Fracc. Pedregal de San Francisco ("Fracc." stands for "fraccionamiento", the name commonly applied to housing subdivisions in Mexico City) • Fracc. Romero de Terreros • Girasoles I • Girasoles II • Girasoles III • Hacienda de Coyoacán • Hermosillo • Huayamilpas • Hueso Infonavit • IMAN 580 • Insurgentes Cuicuilco • Insurgentes San Ángel • Jardínes de Coyoacán • Jardines del Pedregal de San Ángel Oriente • Jardines del Pedregal de San Ángel • Joyas del Pedregal • Las Cabañas • Las Campanas • Los Cedros • Los Cipreses • Los Ciruelos • Los Fresnos • Los Olivos • Los Robles • Los Sauces • Media Luna • Módulo Social Fovissste • Nueva Díaz Ordaz • Parque San Andrés • Paseos de Taxqueña • Pedregal de Carrasco Sec. Casas A • Pedregal de Carrasco Sec. Casas B • Pedregal de Carrasco Sec. Casas C • Pedregal de Carrasco Sec. I • Pedregal de Carrasco Sec. II • Pedregal de Carrasco Sec. III • Pedregal de Carrasco Sec. IV-A • Pedregal de Carrasco Sec. IV • Pedregal de Carrasco Sec. V • Pedregal de Carrasco Sec. VI • Pedregal de Carrasco Sec. VII • Pedregal de Maurel • Pedregal de Santa Úrsula Coapa • Pedregal del Sur • Petrolera Taxqueña • Piloto V Culhuacán • Popular Emiliano Zapata • Prado Churubusco • Prados Coyoacán • Presidentes Ejidales • Pueblo de Copilco el Alto • Pueblo de Copilco El Bajo • Pueblo de la Candelaria • Pueblo de los Reyes • Pueblo de San Francisco Culhuacán (Barrio de San Juan Magdalena y Barrio de Santa Anita are within this Pueblo/town) • Pueblo de San Pedro Tepetlapa • Pueblo de Santa Úrsula Coapa • Romero de Terreros • Santa Cecilia • Santa Martha del Sur • Santo Domingo de los Reyes • U.H. CROC VI • U.H. STUNAM • U.H. Altillo Universidad (U.H. stands for Unidad Habitacional, "apartment complex") • U.H. Candelaria • U.H. Copilco 300 • U.H. Copilco Universidad • U.H. Ermita Churubusco • U.H. Integración Latinoamericana • U.H. los Reyes • U.H. Monte de Piedad • U.H. Prolongación División del Norte • U.H. San Pablo • U.H. Santa Rosa Coapa • U.H. Taxqueña 1802, 1810-Bis, 1818 • U.H. Tlalpan (Centro Urbano) • U.H. Universidad 2016, 202 • Vejo Ejido de Santa Úrsula • Villa Coyoacán • Villa Olímpica • Villa Quietud • Villa San Francisco • Villas del Pedregal • Vistas de Maurel • Xotepingo

=== Cuajimalpa de Morelos ===
col. Abdias García Soto • col. Adolfo Lopez Mateos • col. Agua Bendita • col. Amado Nervo • col. Amp. El Yaqui • col. Amp. Memetla • col. Bosques de Las Lomas • col. Campestre Palo Alto • col. Contadero • col. Cooperativa Palo Alto • col. Cruz Blanca • col. Cuajimalpa • col. El Ébano • col. El Molinito • col. El Molino • col. El Tianguillo • col. El Yaqui • col. Granjas Navidad • col. Granjas Palo Alto • col. Jesús del Monte • col. La Manzanita • col. La Pila • col. La Venta • col. Las Lajas • col. Las Maromas • col. Las Tinajas • col. Locaxco • col. Loma del Padre • col. Lomas de Chamizal • col. Lomas de Memetla • col. Lomas de San Pedro • col. Lomas de Vista Hermosa • col. Manzanastitla • col. Memetla • col. San José de Los Cedros • col. Santa Fe • col. Tepetongo • col. Xalpa • col. Zentlápatl • Pueblo San Lorenzo Acopilco • Pueblo San Mateo Tlaltenango • Pueblo San Pablo Chimalpa • Pueblo San Pedro Cuajimalpa • Pueblo Santa Rosa Xochiac

=== Cuauhtémoc ===
The neighborhoods of the Cuahtémoc borough of Mexico City are:

Colonia	Population as of 2010	Map
Algarín	5,556	Neighborhood map of Cuauhtémoc
Ampliación Asturias	5,708	Neighborhood map of Cuauhtémoc
Asturias	4,364	Neighborhood map of Cuauhtémoc
Atlampa	14,433	Neighborhood map of Cuauhtémoc
Buenavista	15,605	Neighborhood map of Cuauhtémoc
Buenos Aires	5,772	Neighborhood map of Cuauhtémoc
Centro	61,229	Neighborhood map of Cuauhtémoc
Condesa	8,453	Neighborhood map of Cuauhtémoc
Cuauhtémoc	11,399	Neighborhood map of Cuauhtémoc
Doctores	44,703	Neighborhood map of Cuauhtémoc
Esperanza	4,072	Neighborhood map of Cuauhtémoc
Ex Hipódromo de Peralvillo	11,711	Neighborhood map of Cuauhtémoc
Felipe Pescador	1,988	Neighborhood map of Cuauhtémoc
Guerrero	42,339	Neighborhood map of Cuauhtémoc
Hipódromo	13,572	Neighborhood map of Cuauhtémoc
Hipódromo Condesa	3,204	Neighborhood map of Cuauhtémoc
Juárez	10,184	Neighborhood map of Cuauhtémoc
Maza	2,503	Neighborhood map of Cuauhtémoc
Morelos	36,590	Neighborhood map of Cuauhtémoc
Obrera	35,224	Neighborhood map of Cuauhtémoc
Paulino Navarro	5,307	Neighborhood map of Cuauhtémoc
Peralvillo	20,213	Neighborhood map of Cuauhtémoc
Roma Norte	27,770	Neighborhood map of Cuauhtémoc
Roma Sur	17,435	Neighborhood map of Cuauhtémoc
San Rafael	19,684	Neighborhood map of Cuauhtémoc
San Simón Tolnáhuac	9,885	Neighborhood map of Cuauhtémoc
Santa María Insurgentes	1,480	Neighborhood map of Cuauhtémoc
Santa María la Ribera	40,960	Neighborhood map of Cuauhtémoc
Tabacalera	3,267	Neighborhood map of Cuauhtémoc
Tránsito	9,720	Neighborhood map of Cuauhtémoc
Unidad Habitacional Nonoalco-Tlatelolco	27,843	Neighborhood map of Cuauhtémoc
Valle Gómez	6,281	Neighborhood map of Cuauhtémoc
Vista Alegre	3,400	Neighborhood map of Cuauhtémoc

=== Gustavo A. Madero ===
6 De Junio • 7 De Noviembre • 15 De Agosto • 25 De Julio • 51 Legislatura • Acueducto De Guadalupe (Rdcial) • Acueducto De Guadalupe (U Hab) • Ahuehuetes • Aidee Solís Cárdenas-Matías Romero (U Hab) • Aragon Inguaran • Aragon La Villa (Aragon) • Arboledas De Cuautepec • Arboledas De Cuautepec (Ampl) • Arroyo Guadalupe (U Hab) • Belisario Dominguez • Benito Juarez • Benito Juarez (Ampl) • Bondojito • C T M Aragon (U) • C T M Aragon Ampliacion (U) • Camino A San Juan De Aragon (Pblo) • Campestre Aragon I • Campestre Aragon Ii • Capultitlan • Casas Aleman (Ampl) I • Casas Aleman (Ampl) Ii • Castillo Chico • Castillo Grande • Castillo Grande (Ampl) • Cerro Prieto • Chalma De Guadalupe I • Chalma De Guadalupe Ii • Churubusco Tepeyac • Cocoyotes • Cocoyotes (Ampl) • Compositores Mexicanos • Constitucion De La Republica • Cooperativa Luis Enrique Rodríguez Orozco (U Hab) • Ctm Atzacoalco (U Hab) • Ctm El Risco (U Hab) • Cuautepec De Madero • Cuautepec El Alto (Pblo) • Cuchilla Del Tesoro • Cuchilla La Joya • Defensores De La Republica • Del Bosque • Del Obrero • Dm Nacional • Eduardo Molina I (U Hab) • Eduardo Molina Ii (U Hab) • Ejidos San Juan De Aragon 1a Seccion (U Hab) • Ejidos San Juan De Aragon 2a Seccion (U Hab) • El Arbolillo • El Arbolillo 1 (U Hab) • El Arbolillo 2 (U Hab) • El Arbolillo 3 (U Hab) • El Carmen • El Coyol (U Hab) • El Olivo • Emiliano Zapata • Emiliano Zapata (Ampl) • Estanzuela • Estanzuela • Ex-Escuela De Tiro • Faja De Oro • Fernando Casas Aleman • Ferrocarrilera Insurgentes • Fovissste Cuchilla (U Hab) • Fovissste Rio De Guadalupe (U Hab) • Fovisste Aragon (U Hab) • Gabriel Hernandez • Gabriel Hernandez (Ampl) I • Gabriel Hernandez (Ampl) Ii • General Felipe Berriozabal • Gertrudis Sanchez 1a Seccion • Gertrudis Sanchez 2a Seccion • Gertrudis Sanchez 3a Seccion • Graciano Sanchez • Granjas Modernas-San Juan De Aragon (Ampl) • Guadalupe Insurgentes • Guadalupe Proletaria • Guadalupe Proletaria (Ampl) • Guadalupe Tepeyac • Guadalupe Victoria • Guadalupe Victoria II • Heroe De Nacozari • Heroes De Chapultepec • Hornos De Aragon (U Hab) • Indeco (U Hab) • Industrial I • Industrial Ii • Infonavit (U Hab) • Infonavit Camino San Juan De Aragon (U Hab) • Infonavit Loreto Fabela (U Hab) • Jaime S Emiliano G • Jorge Negrete • Jose Maria Morelos Y Pavon I (U Hab) • Jose Maria Morelos Y Pavon Ii (U Hab) • Joyas Vallejo (U Hab) • Juan De Dios Batiz (U Hab) • Juan Gonzalez Romero • Juventino Rosas • La Candelaria Ticoman (Barr) • La Casilda • La Cruz (Barr) • La Esmeralda (U Hab) • La Esmeralda I • La Esmeralda Ii • La Esmeralda Iii • La Forestal • La Forestal 1 • La Forestal 2 • La Forestal 3 • La Joya • La Joyita • La Laguna Ticoman (Barr) • La Malinche • La Pastora • La Patera-Condomodulos (U Hab) • La Pradera • La Pradera I (U Hab) • La Pradera Ii (U Hab) • La Purisima Ticoman (Barr) • Lindavista I • Lindavista Ii • Lindavista Vallejo (U Hab) • Loma De La Palma • Lomas De Cuautepec • Lomas De San Juan Ixhuatepec (2a Seccion) • Los Olivos (U Hab) • Luis Donaldo Colosioa • Magdalena De Las Salinas • Malacates • Malacates Ampliación • Malvinas Mexicanas • Martin Carrera I • Martin Carrera Ii • Martires De Rio Blanco • Martires De Rio Blanco (Ampl) • Maximino Avila Camacho • Narciso Bassols (U Hab) • Nueva Atzacoalco I • Nueva Atzacoalco Ii • Nueva Atzacoalco Iii • Nueva Industrial Vallejo (Fracc) • Nueva Tenochtitlan • Nueva Vallejo • Palmatitla • Panamericana • Panamericana (Ampl) • Parque Metropolitano • Pemex Lindavista (U Hab) • Planetario Lindavista • Plaza Oriente (Rdcial) • Prados De Cuautepec • Progreso Nacional (Ampl) • Progreso Nacional I • Progreso Nacional Ii • Providencia (Ampl) • Providencia I • Providencia Ii • Providencia Iii • Quetzalcoatl 3 • Residencial La Escalera (Fracc) • Residencial Zacatenco • Revolucion Imss (U Hab) • Rosas Del Tepeyac • Salvador Diaz Miron • San Antonio • San Bartolo Atepehuacan (Pblo) • San Felipe De Jesus I • San Felipe De Jesus Ii • San Felipe De Jesus Iii • San Felipe De Jesus Iv • San Jose De La Escalera • San Jose Ticoman • San Juan De Aragon (Pblo) • San Juan De Aragon 1a Seccion (U Hab) I • San Juan De Aragon 1a Seccion (U Hab) Ii • San Juan De Aragon 2a Seccion (U Hab) I • San Juan De Aragon 2a Seccion (U Hab) Ii • San Juan De Aragon 3a Seccion (U Hab) I • San Juan De Aragon 3a Seccion (U Hab) Ii • San Juan De Aragon 4a Y 5a Seccion (U Hab) I • San Juan De Aragon 4a Y 5a Seccion (U Hab) Ii • San Juan De Aragon 6a Seccion (U Hab) I • San Juan De Aragon 6a Seccion (U Hab) Ii • San Juan De Aragon 7 Secc (U Hab) I • San Juan De Aragon 7 Secc (U Hab) Ii • San Juan Iii (U Hab) • San Juan Y Guadalupe Ticoman (Barr) • San Miguel Cuautepec • San Miguel-La Escalera (Barr) • San Pedro El Chico • San Pedro Zacatenco (Pblo) • San Rafael Ticoman (Barr) • Santa Isabel Tola (Pblo) • Santa Rosa • Santiago Atepetlac • Santiago Atepetlac (La Selvita) (U Hab) • Santiago Atzacoalco (Pblo) • Sct (U Hab) • Siete Maravillas • Solidaridad Nacional • Sutic Vallejo (U Hab) • Tablas De San Agustin • Tepetatal • Tepeyac Insurgentes • Tlacaelel • Tlacamaca • Tlalpexco • Torres De Quiroga (U Hab) • Torres De San Juan (U Hab) • Torres De San Juan 1b (U Hab) • Torres Lindavista (Fracc) • Tres Estrellas • Triunfo De La Republica • Valle De Madero • Valle Del Tepeyac • Vallejo I • Vallejo Ii • Vallejo Poniente • Vasco De Quiroga • Veronica Castro • Villa De Aragon • Villa De Aragon (Fracc) • Villa Gustavo A Madero • Villa Hermosa • Vista Hermosa • Zona Escolar I • Zona Escolar II • Zona Escolar Oriente • Villa de Guadalupe

=== Iztacalco ===
Viaducto Piedad

=== Iztapalapa ===
San Miguel • Santa Cruz Meyehualco • Lomas Estrella • Santiago Acahualtepec

=== Magdalena Contreras ===
San Jerónimo Lídice

=== Miguel Hidalgo ===
Bosques de las Lomas • Lomas de Chapultepec • Granada, Ampl. Granada • Pensil • Polanco • San Miguel Chapultepec • Torreblanca • Tacuba • Tacubaya

=== Milpa Alta ===
San Pedro Atocpan • Villa Milpa Alta (formerly called Malacachtepec) • San Bartolome Xicomulco • San Francisco Tecoxpa • Santa Ana Tlacotenco • San Lorenzo Tlacoyucan • San Juan Tepanahuac • San Agustin Ohtenco • San Antonio Tecómitl • San Pablo Oztotepec • San Jerónimo Miacantla

=== Tláhuac ===
Agrícola Metropolitana • Del Mar • Miguel Hidalgo • Nopalera • Santiago Zapotitlán • San Francisco Tlaltenco • Santa Catarina Yechuizotl • San Nicolas Tetelco • San Juan Ixtayopan • San Andrés Mixquic • San Pedro Tláhuac

=== Tlalpan ===
Cantera Puente de Piedra • Pueblo Quieto • Toriello Guerra • Huipulco • La Joya • Club de Golf • Hospitales • Miguel Hidalgo • Tlalpan Centro

=== Venustiano Carranza ===
Magdalena Mixhuca • Jardín Balbuena • La Candelaria de los Patos • El Parque • Jamaica • Zaragoza • Romero Rubio • Gómez Farias • Lorenzo Boturini • Merced Balbuena • Artes Gráficas • Federal •

=== Xochimilco ===
La Guadalupita

== See also ==
- Boroughs of the Mexican Federal District
