= Ceniceros =

Ceniceros is a Spanish toponymic surname derived from the word ceniza, meaning ash, and the city of Ceniceros, Burgos. Notable people with the name include:

- Guillermo Ceniceros (born 1939), Mexican painter
- Manuel Ceniceros Gonzalez (born 1971), Mexican Notary
- José Ángel Ceniceros (1900–1979), Mexican politician and diplomat
- José Ignacio Ceniceros (born 1956), Spanish politician
- Lizzi Ceniceros (born 1973), Mexican pianist and orchestra director
- Martín García Ceniceros (fl. 1632), Roman Catholic prelate and inquisitor
- Severino Ceniceros (1880–1937), Mexican revolutionary

== See also ==
- Ceniceros government, the regional government of La Rioja, led by José Ignacio Ceniceros from 2015 to 2019
- Cenicero, a municipality in La Rioja, Spain
  - CD Cenicero, a football club
