= Lizzi =

Lizzi is a surname and given name; notable people with the name include:

== People with the surname ==
- Elena Lizzi (born 1967), Italian politician
- Fernando Lizzi (1914–2003), an Italian civil engineer

== People with the given name ==
- Lizzi Ceniceros (born 1973), Mexican pianist
- Lizzi Collinge (elected 2024), British politician
- Lizzi Holzschuh (1908–1979), Austrian singer and actress
- Lizzi Jackson (born 1991), American beauty pageant titleholder
- Lizzi Waldmüller (1904–1945), an Austrian actress and singer

== See also ==
- Elizabeth (given name)
