= Pedro Lascuráin =

President of Mexico for 45 minutes in 1913

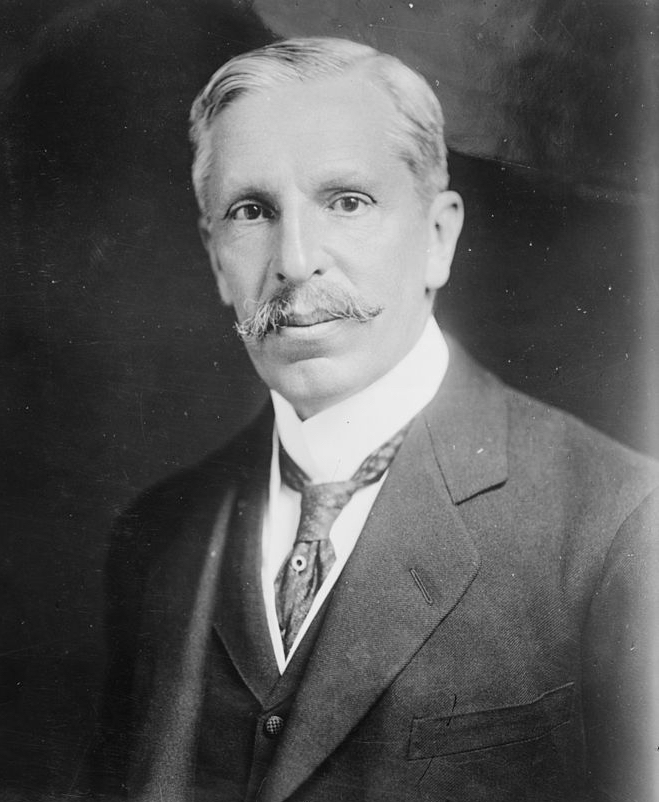
- Portrait, c. 1910–1915

38th President of Mexico
- In office 19 February 1913 (c. 45 minutes)
- Vice President: None (Note: José María Pino Suárez was the last Mexican vice president to be elected. Following his overthrow, the post was left vacant, not being filled by Lascuráin or his successors. When Mexico adopted its current constitution in 1917, the post of vice president was abolished.)
- Preceded by: Francisco I. Madero
- Succeeded by: Victoriano Huerta

Secretary of Foreign Affairs
- In office 10 April 1912 – 19 February 1913
- President: Francisco I. Madero
- Preceded by: Manuel Calero y Sierra
- Succeeded by: Federico Gamboa

Personal details
- Born: Pedro José Domingo de la Calzada Manuel María Lascuráin Paredes; 12 May 1856 Mexico City, Mexico
- Died: 21 July 1952 (aged 96) Mexico City, Mexico
- Resting place: Panteón Francés
- Spouse: María Flores (m. 1890; died 1951)
- Children: 6
- Relatives: Mariano Paredes y Arrillaga (grandfather); Juan Manuel Flores (father-in-law)

Pedro José Domingo de la Calzada Manuel María Lascuráin Paredes (8 May 1856 – 21 July 1952) was a Mexican politician and lawyer who served as the 38th president of Mexico for 45 minutes on 19 February 1913, the shortest presidency in history. The grandson of Mariano Paredes, the 15th president of Mexico, Lascuráin previously served as Mexico's foreign secretary for two terms and was the director of a small law school in Mexico City for 16 years. Born to a wealthy family in Mexico City, Lascuráin studied law at the Escuela Nacional Preparatoria and became a successful lawyer. He held numerous positions in the city's government. During the Mexican Revolution, he became the secretary of foreign affairs in the government of President Francisco I. Madero. In 1913, a coup known as the Ten Tragic Days ousted Madero and Vice President José María Pino Suárez, and Lascuráin became president. His government lasted for less than an hour, during which he appointed the coup's leader, Victoriano Huerta, to the role of foreign secretary. He promptly resigned, being succeeded by Huerta.

After his brief presidency, Lascuráin retired from politics and continued his legal career. He served as the director of the Escuela Libre de Derecho. He died at the age of 96 in Mexico City, today being most well-known for the brevity of his administration.

== Early life ==
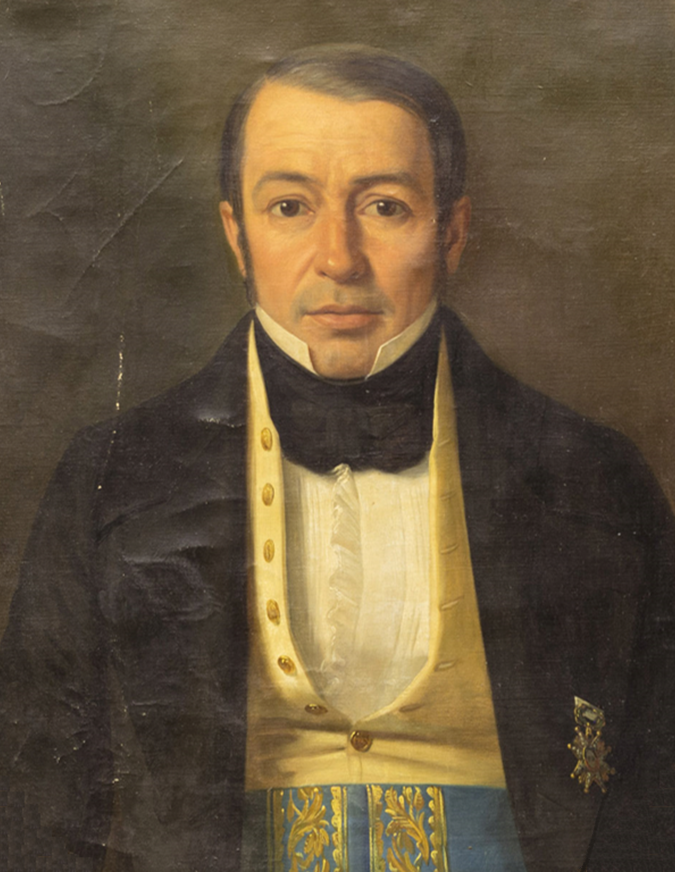
Mariano Paredes y Arrillaga, Lascuráin's grandfather and one-time president of Mexico.

Pedro José Domingo de la Calzada Manuel María Lascuráin Paredes was born on 12 May 1856 in the Rancho de la Romita in Mexico City. (Note: Most sources give a birthdate of 12 May, which is the date on his tomb. However, some sources cite 8 May.) His father, Francisco Lascuráin é Icaza, was a wealthy merchant originally from Veracruz who moved to Mexico City to marry Lascuráin's mother, Ángela (Ana) Paredes Cortés.

Lascurán's family was wealthy and of Basque descent. His maternal grandfather was Mariano Paredes y Arrillaga, who served as the president of Mexico from 1845 to 1846, and his maternal grandmother was Josefa "Pepita" Cortés. His paternal grandparents were Pedro Lascuráin and Dolores de Icaza y Jiménez del Arenal.

Lascuráin was the fourth of his parents' seven children. His elder siblings were Francisco, María de los Angeles, and José, while his younger siblings were María de los Dolores, María, and Ignacio. Francisco, José, and Ignacio all died in infancy. The family's wealth allowed Lascuráin to attend some of Mexico's most prestigious private schools of the era. In his youth, Lascuráin studied law at the Escuela Nacional Preparatoria. He concluded his studies at the Escuela Nacional de Jurisprudencia (National School of Jurisprudence) in Mexico City. He received his law degree there in 1880.

== Personal life ==
In 1890, Lascuráin married María Enriqueta Flores Manzanera (born 1873), the daughter of Juan Manuel Flores, a governor of Durango during the Porfiriato. They had six children: Pedro, Ana, Fernando, Francisco, Enrique, and José de Jesús Lascuráin Flores. Pedro Lascuráin Flores died as an infant. Pedro Lascuráin and María Flores remained married until her death on 20 June 1951. Lascuráin was a devout Catholic.

== Early career ==
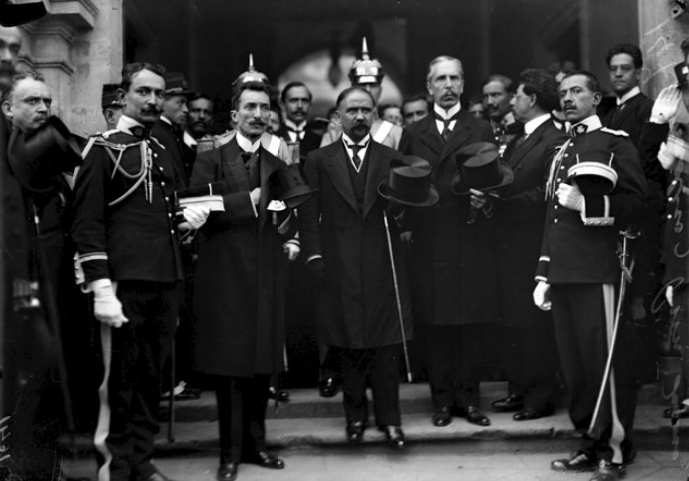
Lascuráin (right) with President Francisco I. Madero (center) and Vice President José María Pino Suárez (left) at the funeral of Justo Sierra in 1912.

After receiving his degree, Lascuráin became a lawyer at the firm of his former teacher, Agustín Rodríguez Aldunate. He eventually founded his own law practice. He also became a businessman in real estate, and after inheriting several Mexico City properties from his father in 1901, he, along with American businessmen, founded the Compañía Fraccionadora de la Calzada de Chapultepec, which was responsible for founding Colonia Roma.

Beginning in 1902, Lascuráin served as a syndic for the ayuntamiento of Mexico City. He became the mayor of Mexico City in 1910 while Francisco I. Madero began a campaign against the re-election of Porfirio Díaz. Lascuráin was a supporter of Madero, and after Madero was elected president to replace Díaz, Lascuráin served twice as foreign secretary in Madero's cabinet, from 9 April 1912 to 4 December 1912, and from 16 January 1913 to 18 February 1913. In between the two terms, he again was the mayor of Mexico City. As foreign secretary, he had to deal with the demands of Henry Lane Wilson, the United States ambassador to Mexico.

== Presidency ==
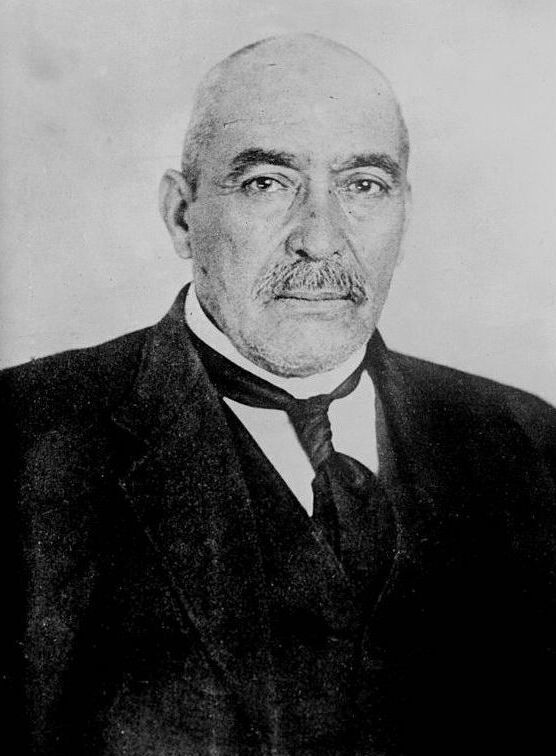
Victoriano Huerta (pictured) led the coup that ousted Madero and Pino Suárez, and succeeded Lascuráin as president

On 9 February 1913, a coup d'état to overthrow Madero, known as the Ten Tragic Days (Spanish: Decena Trágica), began. By the 18th, the pro-Madero general Victoriano Huerta switched sides and joined the coup, capturing Madero and part of his cabinet. The president and vice president signed their resignations the following day. Lascuráin was one of the people who convinced Madero to resign the presidency while he was being held prisoner in the National Palace and claimed that his life was in danger if he refused.

Under the 1857 Constitution of Mexico, the vice president, the attorney general, the foreign secretary, and the interior secretary stood in line to the presidency. As well as Madero, Huerta had ousted vice president José María Pino Suárez and attorney general Adolfo Valles Baca. To give the coup d'état some appearance of legality, he had Lascuráin assume the presidency, who would then appoint him as his interior secretary, making Huerta next in line to the presidency, and then resign.

The presidency thus passed to Huerta. As a consequence, Lascuráin was president for less than an hour; sources quote figures ranging from 15 to 56 minutes. (Note: The duration most often cited for Lascuráin's presidency is 45 minutes. Other timespans have been given, including 25 minutes and 28 minutes. The time of day of his presidency is also somewhat disputed. Some sources say his presidency last from 5:15 p.m. to 6:00 p.m., while others state 10:30 p.m. to 11:00 p.m.) This makes his presidency the shortest in the history of Mexico and the world.

Huerta called a late-night special session of Congress, and under the guns of his troops, the legislators endorsed his assumption of power. A few days later, Huerta had Madero and Pino Suárez killed.

== Later life and legacy ==
Huerta offered Lascuráin a post in his cabinet, but Lascuráin declined. He retired from politics and began practicing again as a lawyer. He was the director of the Escuela Libre de Derecho, a conservative law school, for 16 years and published extensively on commercial and civil law. Lascuráin died on 21 July 1952 at his home in Mexico City. His wife had died over a year earlier, on 20 June 1951. The couple are buried in the Panteón Francés in Mexico City.

Lascuráin is today most known for the brevity of his term. Manuel Ajenjo, writing for El Economista, remarked that Lascuráin's name was longer than his presidency. He jokingly stated that this brevity made him go down in history as the "best president in Mexican history" because he did not have time to "dirty the bathroom". Playwright Flavio González Mello wrote a play in 2005 about Lascuráin, titled Lascuráin o la brevedad del poder.

== See also ==
- List of heads of state of Mexico

== Notes ==
Political offices
Preceded by Francisco I. Madero	President of Mexico; 19 February 1913 (c. 45 minutes)	Succeeded by Victoriano Huerta
Records
Preceded by Philippe Pétain	Oldest living state leader 23 July 1951 – 21 July 1952	Succeeded by Christopher Hornsrud
