= Pascual Boing =

Mexican soft drink brand

- Company type: Worker's cooperative
- Industry: Beverage
- Founded: 1940; 86 years ago
- Founder: Rafael Victor Jiménez Zamudo
- Headquarters: Mexico City, Mexico
- Area served: Mexico, United States, Canada, Central and South America and China
- Products: soft drinks, fruit pulp, juices, nectars and milk
- Number of employees: 5000
- Website: Company website

Pascual Boing is a Mexican soft drink maker mostly known for its fruit flavored beverages marketed under the Pascual, Boing! and Lulú brands. The enterprise was begun in 1940 and successfully held against the entrance of foreign competitors in the Mexican market. However, continued labor disputes led to a strike in 1982, which ended in 1985 with the workers obtaining the right to take over the company, running it as a cooperative. Since then, it has remained a profitable business although it has lost market share in Mexico, due to competition from Coca-Cola and Pepsi. This has prompted the company to protest unfair practices which exclude it from retail venues as well as look abroad to new markets, especially in the United States. it is also one of the sponsors for many Consejo Mundial de Lucha Libre and Lucha Libre AAA Worldwide's shows

== History ==
The company was originally a private enterprise, started in 1940 by Rafael Victor Jiménez Zamudo. In the 1960s, Jíménez began using tetra paks and acquired its Northern plant from Canada Dry, along with a franchise to produce and market these products. From its beginnings to the early 1980s, the company had tremendous growth with Jiménez very successful in the face of competition from multinational corporations. Two plants were opened in the 1960s. In 1980, the company was fourth in the soft drink market in Mexico. However, the working conditions at the plants were exploitative, with workers obligated to work overtime without pay increases. There had been several attempts to organize workers at the plant due to abuses, but management fired organizers.

In March 1982, the Mexican federal government decreed that all workers, including those in private companies, receive thirty percent wage increases because of the devaluation of the peso. However, Jiménez refused the increase, stating that he could not afford it. Several political activists organized the workers to protest and as 150 workers were fired for participating, all the workers went on strike on May 18, 1982, shutting down operations. On May 31, Jiménez and others confronted the striking workers at the plant in Colonia Tránsito. Violence broke out and two strikers were killed, with seventeen wounded. Jiménez was formally accused of murder but was not prosecuted.

The work stoppage went on for three years. At one point, workers took over the federal arbitration offices, and a formal committee to represent the workers was formed. They gained legal recognition as well a public support for their cause. In 1983, the courts found in favor of the workers in litigation against the company and in 1984, workers met with President Miguel de la Madrid. Jiménez declared the company bankrupt and tried to sell the facilities. However, the workers and federal authorities worked out an arrangement that the workers would take over the company entirely, including facilities and brand. A cooperative called the Sociedad Cooperativa Trabajadores de Pascual S.C.L. was formed on May 27, 1985.

After years of being idle, the new worker/owners needed about 1.5 million dollars to restart operations. During the strike, over 320 painters sided with the workers including Rufino Tamayo, David Alfaro Siqueiros, Francisco Toledo, Felipe Ehrenberg, Carolia Paniagua, José Chávez Morado, Alfredo Zalce, Guillermo Ceniceros and José Luis Cuevas as well as the Salón de la Plástica Mexicana and Taller de Gráfica Popular by donating artworks to auction off. There were two small auctions but the money being raised was not sufficient and the continued selling of the artworks became difficult. Instead, the main union of the Universidad Nacional Autónoma de México provided the funds needed to obtain permits and service the machinery. The remaining painting remained with the company and in 1991 an entity called the Fundación Cultural Trabajadores de Pascual y del Arte, A. C. was created for their care and promotion.

The new cooperative has had multiple struggles since it was created. The start of the cooperative was rocky with internal struggles among the workers as to how to organize and operate. However, operations as a cooperative began on November 27, 1985, with workers receiving their first share of profits in May 1986. The former owner, Jiménez, lost the legal right to use the name Pascual Boing but nonetheless was doing so from a plant in Aguascalientes until cooperative representative negotiated a deal.

Another ongoing problem is that the land on which the original factories are located did not belong to the original company but rather to the owner's wife, Victoria Valdez. She was allowed to sue the cooperative in 1989 and won the case in 2003, with the court ordering Pascual off the land. At this point, then Mexico City mayor Andrés Manuel López Obrador, expropriated the land from Valdez to give to Pascual. However, in 2005, the Supreme Court decreed this expropriation to be illegal, since it did not benefit the public but a private company that produced a non-essential product.

Pascual does not see itself as a private, for-profit company; they claim that being worker-owned, they perform a social function and as such expropriation in their favor is for public benefit. Since their founding, they have received vocal and political support from the PRD, intellectuals, writers such as Elena Poniatowska, college students and those opposed to globalization.

Despite its problems, the cooperative has grown, opening major processing plants in San Juan del Río, Querétaro, in 1992, one in Tizayuca, Hidalgo, in 2003 and another in Culiacán, Sinaloa, in 2006. In the 2000s, it has also been working on markets in the United States and elsewhere, eyeing northern areas nearer the border such as Ciudad Acuña to facilitate export and in 2011 a freezing and bottling plant was begun in Anáhuac, Nuevo León. Despite its growth, the cooperative has had to rebut assertions that it is going broke. For example, in 2007, the company had to deny a chain email stating that it was on the verge of bankruptcy, and to buy the product to save the company.

Today, Pascual Boing is the only remaining wholly Mexican owned major soft drink bottler. The company employs over 5,000 people and generates over 22,000 jobs indirectly, benefitting more than 50,000 families. Part of the enterprise's mission is to show that employee ownership as a cooperative can work. The organization of the cooperative consists of a General Assembly of founders and other partners, followed several boards including Corporate/Investment, Administration, Oversight and the Cultural Foundation. Under these are four commissions called Education, Social Outlook, Arbitration and Technical Control. It is also dedicated to a sense of social responsibility. It has been recognized by the Secretaría del Trabajo as a "clean industry". In 2003, the company partnered with the federal government to circulate information about the prevention or kidnapping of children which included announcements on Pascual Boing trucks and materials for schools.

== Products and production ==
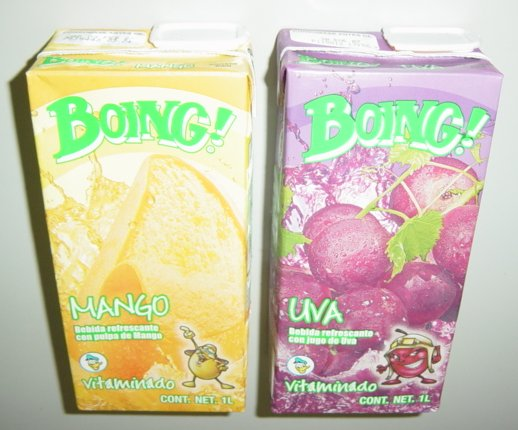
Boing! drinks produced by Pascual Boing

The company sells fruit juice, nectars, concentrates, carbonated beverages, bottled water and milk. It is best known for its fruit flavored drinks such as guava, mango, tamarind, strawberry, apple, pineapple, soursop, grape, lime, grapefruit and peach under the Boing! Lulú and Pascual brands. Other brands include PulpaMex, Woopy, Leche Pascual, Nectasis and Pascuatin.

All of the processing of their products is done by Pascual. Pascual uses real sugar in their products as opposed to fructose although the former is more expensive. It obtains its sugar from the Sociedad Cooperativa Trabajadores del Ingenio Puruarán in Michoacán, purchasing 100% of the annual production. They also use real fruit such as mangos from Veracruz and Guerrero, strawberries from Guanajuato and apples from Puebla along with natural colorings.

The company has nineteen facilities and thirty production lines, capable of producing 120 tons of fruit pulp and 470,970 cases of finished product in three shifts with an annual capacity of fifty million cases of finished product per year. It has two main processing plants: Planta San Juan del Río in Querétaro and Planta Tizayuca in Hidalgo. The Tizayuca plant produces about a billion liters of juice a year and employs about 900 people, working at only sixty percent of capacity. In 2011 the company invested about 25 million pesos to expand the Tizayuca plant. As part of its expansion northward, a smaller plant was built in Anáhuac, Nuevo León.

== Marketing and distribution ==
Most of Pascuals’ products are marketed on the Boing!, Pascual and Lulú brands. While its products can be found in all of Mexico, distribution is concentrated in the center and northeast of the country, with the Mexico City area accounting for sixty percent of sales. There are a total of 1048 distribution centers. It has 19 wholly owned distributors along with 27 major independent distributors in Acapulco, Aguascalientes, Mexico City, Ciudad Madero, Cuernavaca, Guadalajara, Iguala, León, Monterrey, Morelia, Pachuca, Poza Rica, Puebla, Querétaro, Río Blanco, San Luis Potosí and Toluca. In the center of the country, Pascual products are widely found in smaller grocery stores, restaurants and semi-fixed street stands, which account for about half of its sales. Delivery of products is mostly handled by an outside cooperative of truckers.

Pascual Boing is a major exporter of soft drinks in Mexico along with Arca. In 2008, the exported about 1.5 million of the 50 million cases of beverages it produced. It exports to the U.S., Canada, Guatemala, Belize, El Salvador, Costa Rica, Jamaica, Panama and Trinidad and Tobago, with exports to China and South America beginning in 2012.

Its largest export market is the United States, concentrated in Texas, Chicago, North Carolina, Florida and California, where it targets the Hispanic market looking for something from home. As of 2011, sales were about 150,000 cases. NAFTA has helped with the lowering of tariffs, making the products more competitive. Pascual Boing began in small Hispanic groceries and is working to expand into major supermarkets but this has been difficult because it does not spend as much on marketing as other soft drink producers. However, the US export market is growing and in the 2000s it began constructing facilities in border areas in order to facilitate export to the United States.

Much of the push to develop foreign markets for Pascual Boing products has come from competition inside Mexico from multinational companies. Pascual Boing has accused makers such as Coca-Cola and Pepsi of monopolistic practices aimed at excluding the Mexican bottlers from retail venues such as small groceries, school cafeterias and public events. Pascual Boing used to have a fifty percent share in Mexico but this has shrunk to fifteen percent. Today, Coca-Cola and its bottlers control over 75% of the Mexican soft drink market. Pascual Boing accuses Coca-Cola and Pepsi of making outlets sign exclusivity agreements, so that they cannot sell Pascual products. For example, Pascual is excluded from about twenty percent of school campuses in the state of Hidalgo. In 2010, Pascual workers closed the Mexico City-Pachuca highway to demand that federal and state authorities do something against these tactics.

== Logo ==
Old logo

The company has had a long-standing dispute with Walt Disney over its duck logo, adopted in the 1940s. The logo was based on Donald Duck including a sailors cap and named Pato Pascual (Pascual Duck). This version can still be found in some places. In the 1980s, Disney sued, leading to some minor changes in the logo. In the 2000s, Disney complained again that the logo looked too much like Donald Duck. In 2007, it was changed again, with the current version having a rapper look with ruffled feathers and a baseball cap turned backwards.

== Fundación Pascual ==
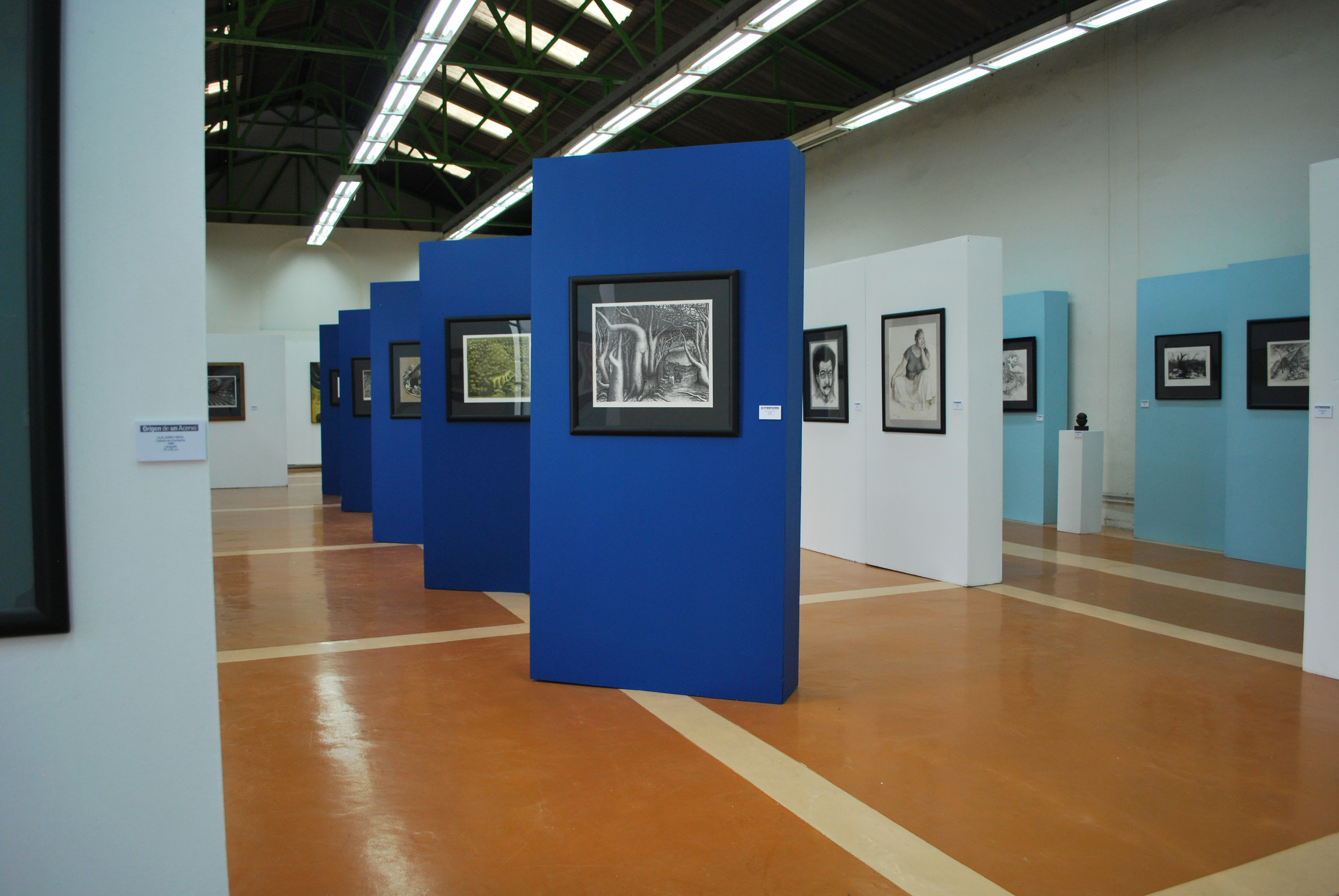
Works from the permanent collection on display at the Centro de Educación Continua Unidad Allende IPN

During the strike of 1982–1985, workers were supported by over 320 artists. After the workers won the right to take over the company, these artists along with the Salón de la Plástica Mexicana and Taller de Gráfica Popular began a project to auction donated works to raise the money needed to restart the idle plants. The project gathered 524 works of art. However, most of the donated paintings were not sold for various reasons ending with the obtaining of the needed money from the main union of the Universidad Nacional Autónoma de México.

The new workers’ cooperative offered to return the works to the artists but most preferred that they remained with the organization. From 1985 to 1991, the collection increased to almost one thousand pieces due to continued donations. In 1991, the cooperative created the Fundación Cultural de Trabajadores de Pascual to care and promote the collection. The permanent collection mostly contains works by about 400 Mexican and Latin American artists but also some from Spain and Germany, representing about 400 artists, mostly dating from the middle to late 20th century. The collection includes sculptures, canvas works, diptychs, triptychs and more. The collection has been put on display various times such as in the Centro Cultural El Refugio in Tlaquepaque and Espacio del Arte of Televisa.

== See also ==
- List of soft drinks by country
