= Sara Pérez Romero =

First lady of Mexico (1870–1952)

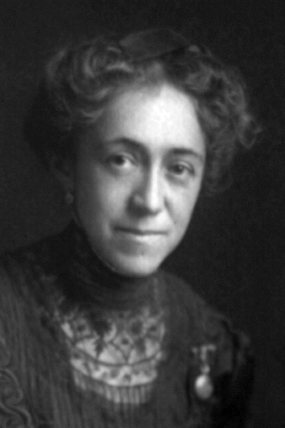
- Pérez Romero in 1911.

First Lady of Mexico
- In role November 6, 1911 – February 19, 1913
- President: Francisco I. Madero
- Preceded by: Refugio Borneque
- Succeeded by: María Enriqueta Flores Manzanera

Personal details
- Born: July 19, 1870 San Juan del Río, Queretaro, Mexico
- Died: July 31, 1952 (aged 82) Mexico City, Mexico
- Resting place: Panteón Francés de la Piedad
- Party: Progressive Constitutionalist Party
- Spouse: Francisco I. Madero (m. 1903; died 1913)
- Occupation: Politician and activist

Sara Pérez Romero (July 19, 1870 – July 31, 1952), also known as Sara Pérez de Madero, was a Mexican politician and activist who served as First Lady of Mexico from 1911 to 1913, as the wife of Francisco I. Madero, the 37th President of Mexico. Together with Carmen Serdán Alatriste and Aquiles Serdán Alatriste, she formed a group which supported the anti-reelectionist party in the days before the outbreak of the Mexican Revolution. Pérez Romero was also known as the "First Lady of the Revolution" or by her nickname, Sarita.

== Early life ==
Sara Pérez Romero was born on June 19, 1870, in San Juan del Río, Querétaro. She was one of the daughters born to Avelina Romero and the landowner Macario Pérez Romero. She suffered the loss of her mother at a young age. Sara passed the first years of her childhood and adolescence in Aculco and Arroyo Zarco. To continue her studies, she traveled to Mexico City. At the beginning of 1893, she was sent to the College of Notre Dame in San Francisco, California, where she met Mercedes Madero and Magdalena Madero.

== Marriage and personal life ==
Pérez Romero started dating Francisco I. Madero in 1897. They signed a marriage contract in 1903; this was a civil ceremony celebrated on January 26 in the capital. On the 27th, they held the religious ceremony in the chapel of the archbishop's palace on the second street of Santo Domingo. The wedding was conducted by the archbishop Próspero María y Alarcón y Sánchez de la Barquera. Guests dined in the Reform Hotel. The couple made their home in San Pedro de las Colonias in the state of Coahuila. Pérez Romero did not have children.

In 1909, when Madero was jailed in Monterrey, Pérez Romero lived with him in prison. However, when Madero was transferred to San Luis Potosí, she was forced to rent a house near the penitentiary because they did not let her be with her husband. Pérez Romero saw him whenever she could; also, together with the potosino Pedro Antonio de los Santos, she raised a bail of ten thousand pesos so Madero could go free.

When the Mexican Revolution began, Pérez Romero accompanied her husband on his presidential campaign. She accompanied him to all areas, both to soldiers' camps and party conferences, both to speeches and talks.

== Presidency of Francisco I. Madero ==
Being the first lady, Pérez Romero rallied the troops, organized proselytizing acts, held festivals in favor of the victims of the armed movement, assisted at workers' meetings, and received the organizers of women's political clubs (such as the Hijas de Cuauhtemoc), and attended committees. She presided over the Club Caridad y Progreso (Charity and Progress Club), and she funded the Cruz Blanca Neutral por la Humanidad (Neutral White Cross for Humanity). Pérez Romero and her husband were the bridesmaid and best man for the wedding of Emiliano Zapata and Josefa Espejo in 1911.

== Coup and later life ==
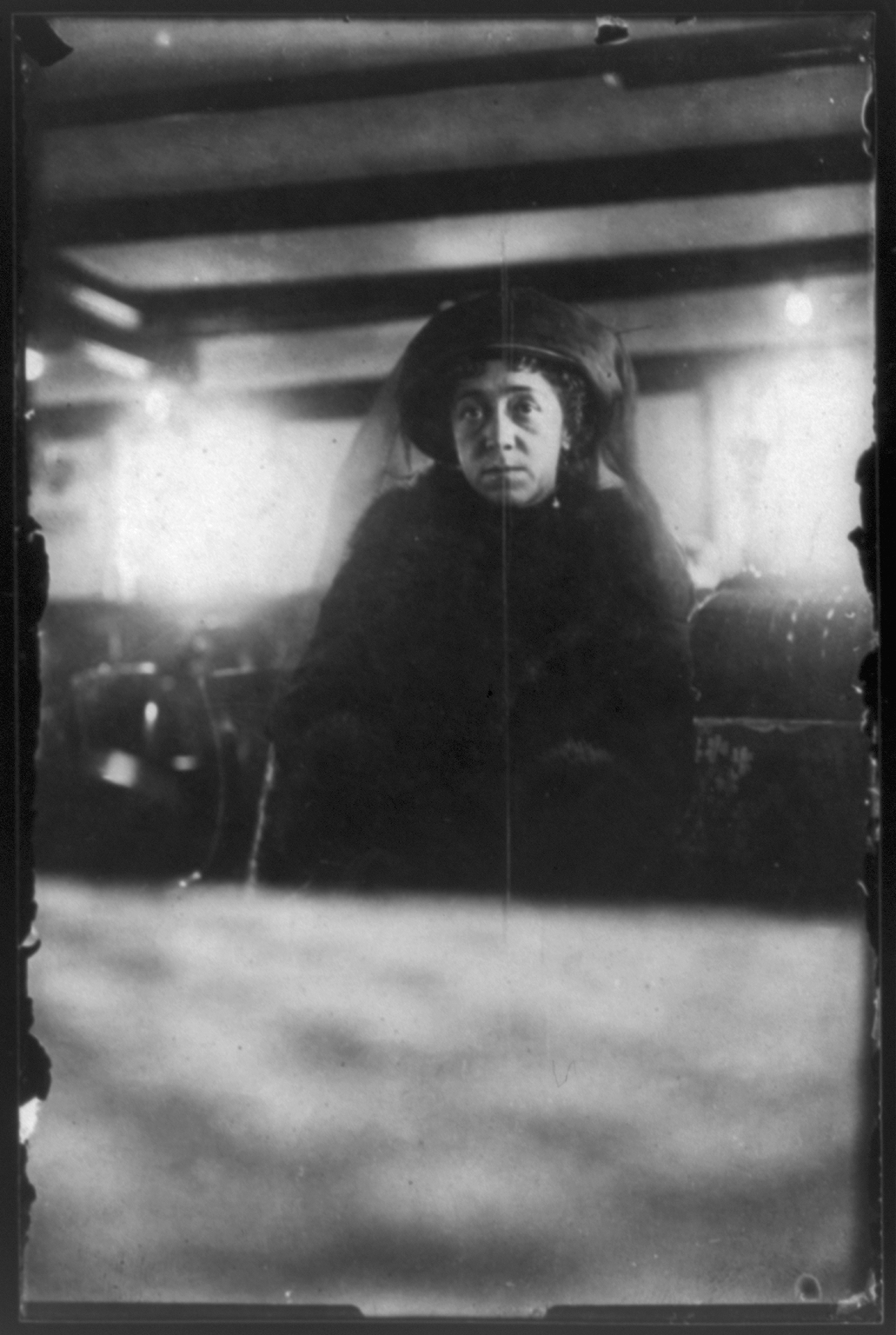
Pérez Romero in mourning, 1913

In February 1913, there was a coup against President Madero. This episode, known as the Ten Tragic Days, ended with the apprehension and assassination of President Madero, of Vice President José María Pino Suárez, and of various maderist politicians. Upon the death of her husband, Pérez Romero was exiled to Cuba, where she was taken in by the ambassador Manuel Márquez Sterling. She then lived in the United States, and in 1921 she returned to Mexico City. Once in the city, she lived in a house on Zacatecas in the Colonia Roma neighborhood. She remained there until her death, living off a government pension. She was part of the Club de Lealtad a Madero (Loyalty to Madero Club).

== Interview ==
In 1916, three years after the Ten Tragic Days, the American journalist Robert Hammond Murray interviewed Sara Pérez Romero. In the interview, she related how, during the imprisonment of the president and vice president, she went to seek help from the U.S. ambassador Henry Lane Wilson. She asked him to protect them, and he rejected her petition.

== Death ==
Sara Pérez Romero died in her home on July 31, 1952, 39 years after Madero's assassination. The press labeled her "The First Lady of the Revolution." She was laid to rest in the Panteón Francés in Mexico City on August 1, 1952, in the same tomb where her husband was buried. Her coffin was covered with the flag of the White Cross, which she funded together with Elena Arizmendi in 1911. Upon the flag were the words "Por la Humanidad" ("for humanity").

Five of Madero's brothers and many of his relatives assisted with the burial. Also present were the former presidents Pascual Ortiz Rubio, Roque González Garza, and the incumbent at the time, Miguel Alemán Valdés.
