= International Society for Micropiles =

The International Society for Micropiles (ISM) is a consortium of international representatives involved in the research and development, design, and construction of micropiles. In 1994, a core group of ISM members formed what was then IWM, the International Workshop on Micropiles. The intention of the group was to form an international peer review team for the FHWA State of Practice Study on Micropiles (1993-1997), which focused on "classic" micropiles, namely drilled and grouted elements of high capacity. The study was undertaken as a contribution to the ongoing French national research project "FOREVER". This international team of practitioners and academicians have since gathered over the years on several occasions to ensure that the study has reflected current standards and practices worldwide. The synergy of this group of individuals, allied with major demands for technology transfer to "newer" markets mainly from Japan and Scandinavia, led to the organization of an IWM in Seattle, WA in September 1997.

This first IWM has since led to eight additional workshops which have been held since this initial meeting: Ube, Japan (1999); Turku, Finland (2000); Lille, France (2001); Venice, Italy (2002); Seattle, WA (2003); Tokyo, Japan (2004); Schrobenhausen, Germany (2006); and Toronto, Canada (2007). Next workshop is scheduled for the second quarter of 2009 and will be held in London, UK.

Countries sponsoring delegates and providing major contributions to the IWM throughout the years include the United States, France, Japan, Germany, Finland (and other Scandinavian countries), Italy, Belgium, Canada, and the United Kingdom.

The late Dr. Fernando Lizzi of Naples, Italy, who developed the concept of pali radice (root piles), is regarded fondly as the visionary leader of ISM. He obtained the first micropile patents in 1952, and has used micropiles in the restoration of many important and historic monuments internationally. As the "father of micropiles", his creative vision has allowed the technology to blossom worldwide and has sewn the "roots" for its future and that of ISM.
