= Colonia Algarín =

Coordinates: 19°24′17.99″N 99°8′19.76″W

Algarín
- Neighborhood of Mexico City
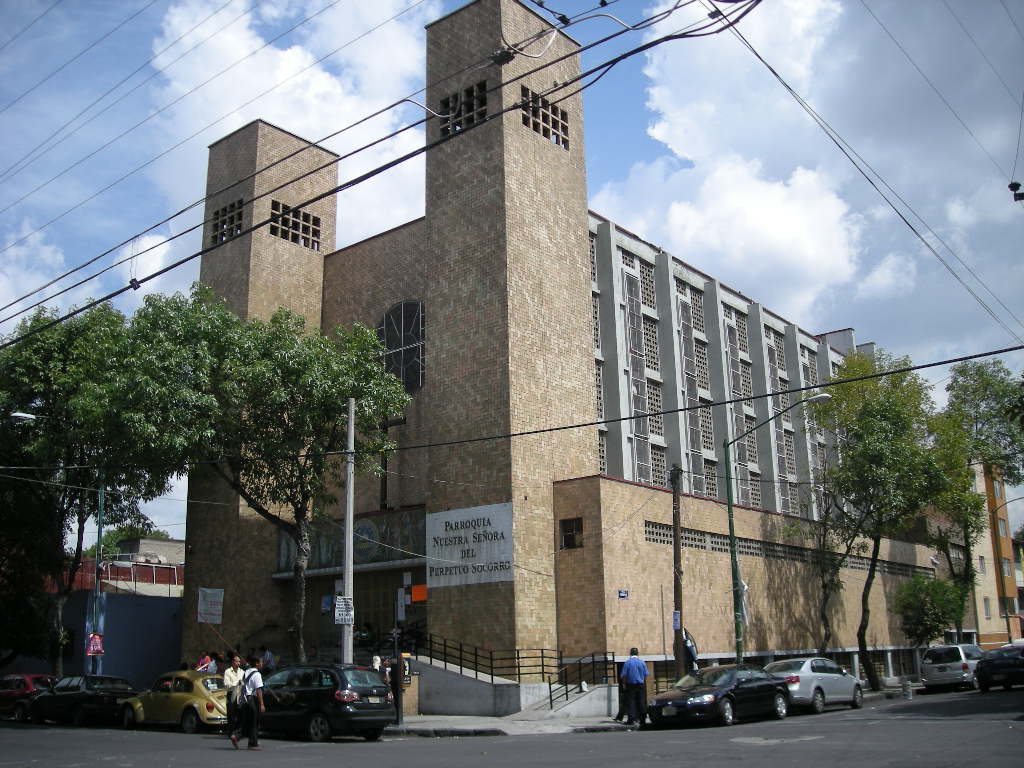
- Nuestra Señora de Perpetuo Socorro Parish, on J. E. Hernández y Dávalos St.

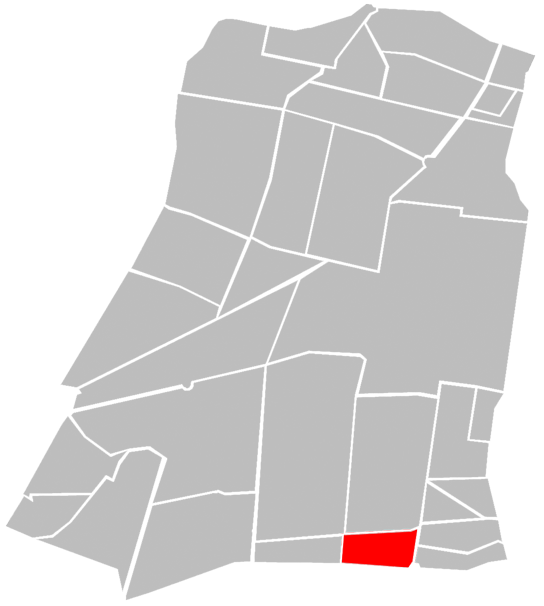
- Location of Colonia Algarín (in red) within Cuauhtémoc borough
- Country: Mexico
- City: Mexico City
- Borough: Cuauhtémoc

Population (2010)
  - Total: 5,556
- Postal code: 06880
- Website: https://algarin.mx

Colonia Algarín is a very small working class residential neighborhood located south of the historic center of Mexico City. Its border to the north is Eje 3 Sur José Peón Contreras, to the south Viaducto Miguel Alemán, to the east San Antonio Abad Av. (Calzada de Tlalpan) and to the west Eje Central Lázaro Cárdenas. Colonia Algarín is located between colonias Buenos Aires (Eje Central), Álamos (Viaducto), Obrera (Eje 3 Sur) and Asturias (San Antonio Abad). On the south border, alongside Viaducto Miguel Alemán, flows the Río de la Piedad. This river, just as in the case as many other rivers of the city, is encased in cement.

== History ==
The exact origin of the name is unknown. The family that owned the land in the area before the neighborhood was established was named Algara. One story states that one of the sons was a fan of sports, earning him the nickname of Algarín, which became extended to the family. The first houses of the neighborhood were built in the 1910s, when a square meter of land cost between 25 and 30 cents. The first main streets were Algarín, now Juan E. Hernández y Dávalos, and Casa del Niño and Hospicio, today Toribio Medina. Now the four main streets are: José Peón Contreras, Bolívar, Isabel La Católica, and 5 de Febrero. Most of the rest of the streets are named for writers, poets, historians and journalists: José María Bustillos, Antonio Plaza, Enrique Granados, Manuel Navarrete, Bernardo Couto, and Marcelino Dávalos. There was a hospice for street children called the Hospicio de Niños Expósitos that existed from 1905 until the 1960s, when it was demolished to house barracks associated with the Presidential Guard Brigade.

== Description ==
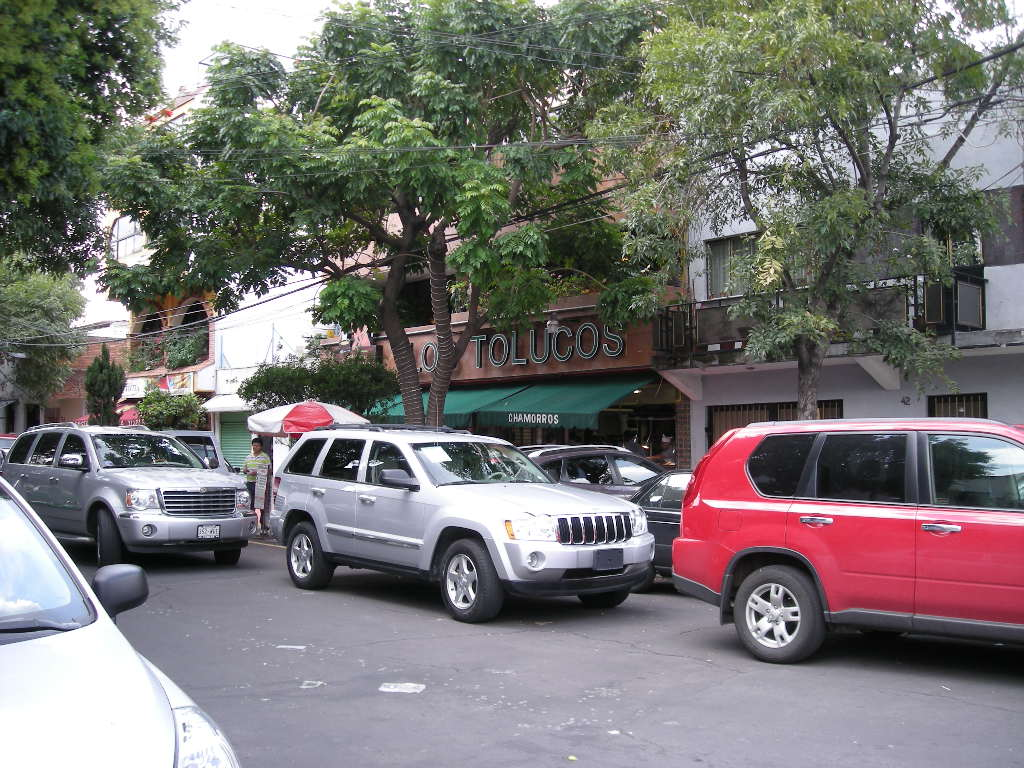
View of the Los Tolucos pozole restaurant on Juan E. Hernández y Dávalos Street

The area is known for restaurants that serve Guerrero style pozole, a type of meat and corn soup/stew as well as carnitas. It attracts many families for pozole, rivaling the San Camilito Market in Plaza Garibaldi. Recommended by newspaper El Universal, Chilango magazine and chowhound.com is "Los Tolucos", located on the corner of J. E. Hernández y Dávalos and Bolívar. It offers the white and green varieties. Another well-known place is Pozolería Tixtla next door.

The parish church for the area is the Parroquia Nuestra Señora del Perpetuo Socorro, located on Juan E. Hernández y Dávalos Street. In 2007, the parish blessed a fleet of taxis dedicated to providing services to the disabled. This taxi service is base at the Magdalena de las Salinas and Gea González hospitals.

In 1938, radio station XEQK-AM's receiving office was installed by baritone and orchestra conductor Angel H. Ferreiro in this neighborhood. The radio signal was sent by telephone and transmissions were made by remote control from Bellas Artes.

The market of the area is located on Isabel La Católica Ave., between Eje 3 Sur and J. E. Hernández y Dávalos.

The neighborhood is also known, jointly with Colonia Obrera, for the great number of printing business where T-shirts, caps, uniforms, advertisements and many other printed issues are made.
