= Colonia Buenos Aires =

Coordinates: 19°24′20.32″N 99°8′58.69″W

Buenos Aires
- Neighborhood of Mexico City
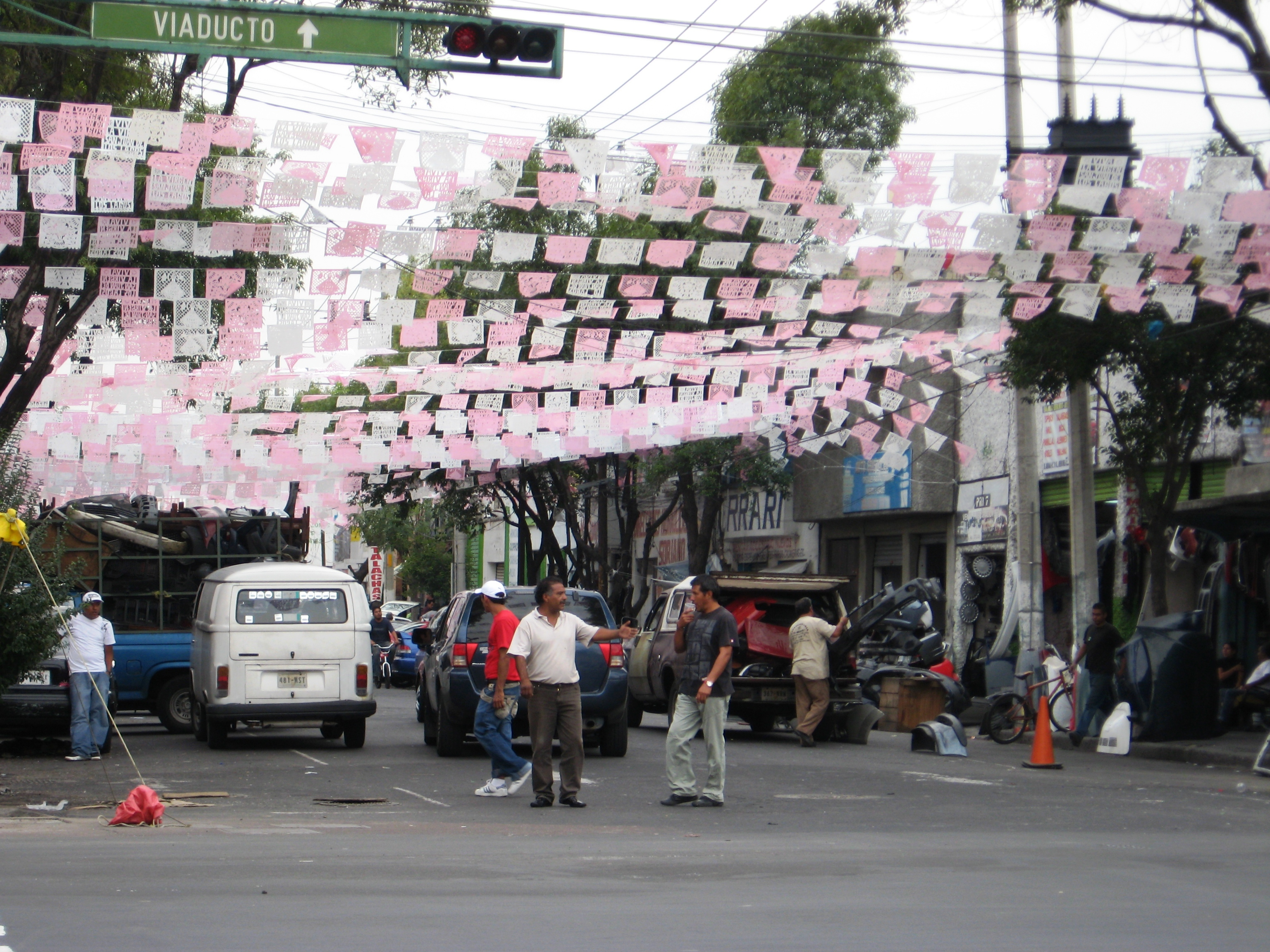
- Dr. Andrade Street at the very north end of the colonia

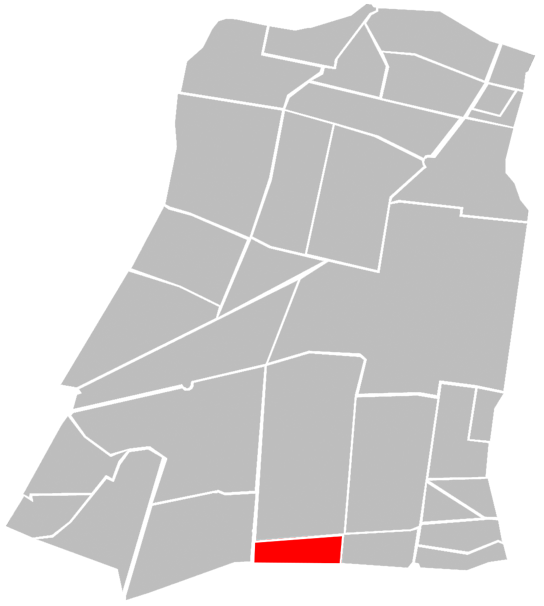
- Location of Colonia Buenos Aires (in red) within Cuauhtémoc borough
- Country: Mexico
- City: Mexico City
- Borough: Cuauhtémoc

Area
  - Land: 34.41 ha (85.0 acres)

Population (2020)
  - Total: 8,002
- Postal code: 06780

Colonia Buenos Aires is a colonia of the Cuauhtémoc borough located south of the historic center of Mexico City. This colonia is primarily known for its abundance of dealers selling used car parts, and an incident when six youths were executed by police. About half of the colonia's residents make a living from car parts, but these businesses have a reputation for selling stolen merchandise. The colonia is also home to an old cemetery established by Maximilian I, which has a number of fine tombs and sculptures.

== Location ==
The neighborhood is bordered by:

- Eje 3 Sur Dr. Ignacio Morones Prieto on the north, across which is Colonia Doctores
- Eje 1 Poniente Cuauhtémoc on the west, across which is Colonia Roma Sur
- Viaducto Miguel Alemán on the south, across which is Colonia Piedad Narvarte and Colonia Atenor Salas
- Eje Central Lázaro Cárdenas on the east, across which is Colonia Algarín

== History ==
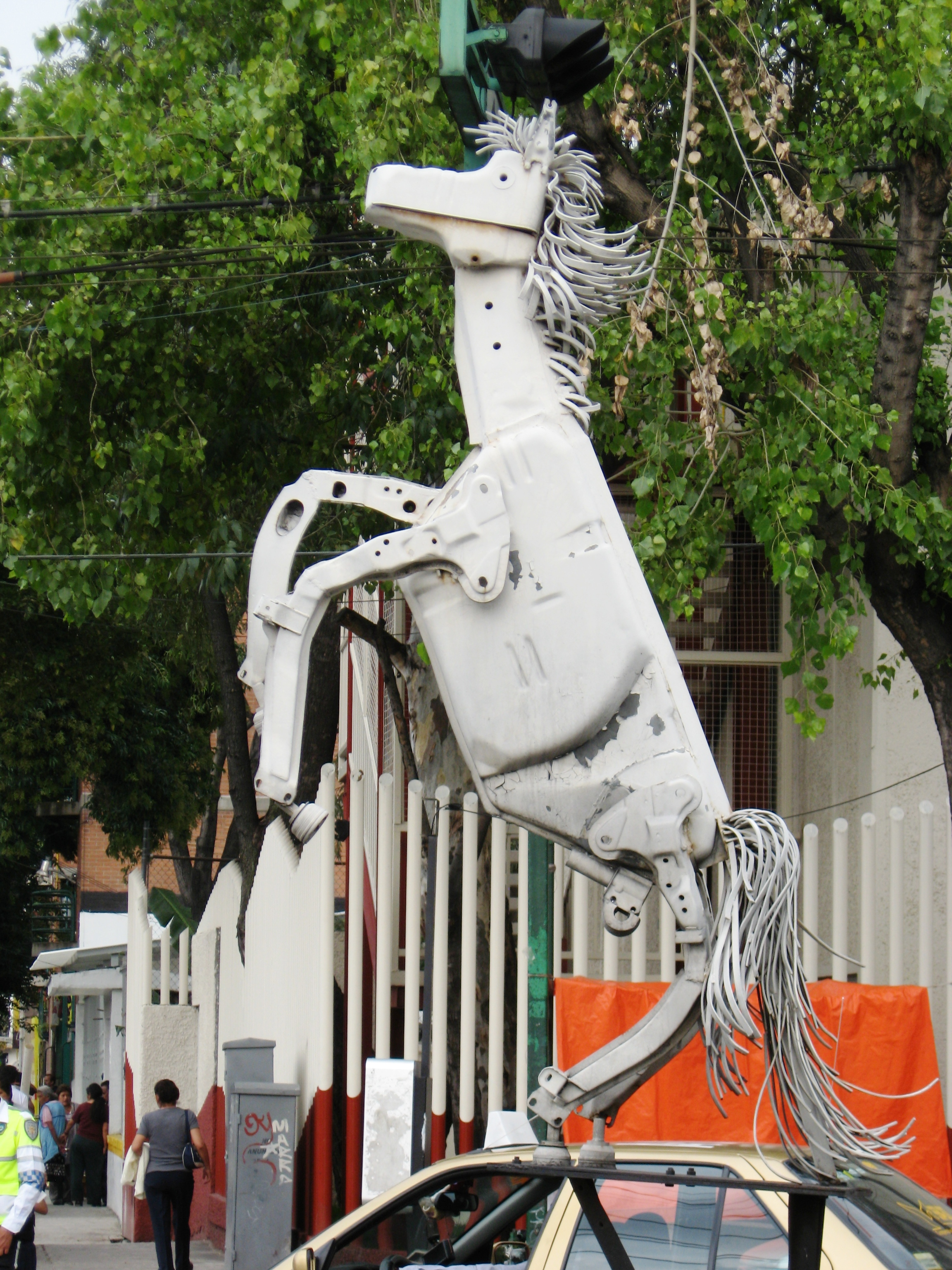
Horse sculpture at the very north end of Dr. Vértiz

While there are no records to establish an exact date, the colonia was probably first constructed at the beginning of the 20th century, beginning with irregular and unregulated housing around Hidalupe and El Tinado Streets. The first mention of it in official records is in the Boletín Municipal in 1920, which reports that 23 blocks and 285 residences were already in existence. The Boletín also mentions that the area was not authorized for housing. It is believed that the name is ironic, as at the time wastewater flowed past here in the Rio La Piedad.

Originally, it was home to a large number of plumbers and those who sold tools. From in the 1940s, with the rise of the automobile, work associated with cars, such as mechanics and taxi drivers began to dominate the economy. This led to the selling of auto parts as the main business.

In 1997, Buenos Aires became famous due to a tragedy that came to symbolize urban violence at that time, being widely reported and analyzed for weeks on radio and television. The incident left the neighborhood with a violent reputation. Six youths disappeared during a police operation on September 8, 1997, by "preventative police" squad of the Secretaria de Seguridad Publica. The sweep was in response to a recent shooting in which a policeman and a resident died. The young men were apprehended by the police as they occupied an abandoned car in front of a city run child care center. Of the six that disappeared, three were found dead in Tlahuac with evidence that they had been executed. The bodies assumed to be of the other three were found in a rural area of Ajusco. The three found in Tlahuac had signs of torture and their faces disfigures beyond recognition. The bodies were mutilated with only one remaining not decapitated. One of the victims received 13 shots, 10 to the head.

More than 400 government agents were investigated including police and some nearby military personnel. Thirty six were accused and 13 convicted. The accused and convicted were mostly members of two elite police squads called the "Zorros" (Foxes) and the "Jaguares" (Jaguars).

The bodies of three of the men were left with authorities because their families demanding DNA tests from abroad to verify identity. Six years after their death, the remains of the three, Ángel Leal Alonso, Carlos Alberto López Inés and Román Morales, were still in the lockers of the Forensics Service. Due to bureaucratic paperwork, the families had not been able to retrieve them, and some had decided to leave them there.

In 1998, the family received reparations from the city. The families demanded one million pesos for each victim but received 400,000. At the corner of Doctor Andrade and Ingeniero Bolaños Cacho an altar to the Virgin of Guadalupe serves as a memorial to the victims.

The notoriety of the event prompted Conrado Tostado, the director of the Museum of the City of Mexico, to get the city to sponsor sculptures for Colonia Buenos Aires. One artist who did work here was Ivonne Domenge. These are sculptures are made of machine parts soldered together and located on the traffic islands on Doctor Vértiz Street.

Another artist who became interesting in working in the colonia was Betsabeé Romero, whose specialty is in altars and commemorative works, with emphasis on symbolism. In 1995, she began to be interested in cars and their role in the urban landscape. She first created a piece using a 1955 Ford Crown Victoria in Tijuana, then began to be interested in Buenos Aires after the 1997 incident. She tried to work in the colonia, creating pieces, much as she did in Tijuana but area residents became suspicious of her activities. Early pieces were quickly vandalized. Romero then worked to introduce herself and her work to residents and workers in the area. This resulted in success, and the “adoption” of five long-abandoned cars on the streets of the colonia.

One of these cars was "seeded" here by local police with the aim of accusing local shop owners of auto theft, thus rendering it "taboo" and "untouchable." This one was converted into a massive flowerpot with a large nopal cactus plant. Another was covered in antique tile. The most accepted was based on a 1979 Grand Marquis parked in front of the child care center where the executed youths had been taken. This car was "bandaged" and otherwise prepped to allow residents to cover it in graffiti, insults, messages and more.

== Description and population ==
Buenos Aires is a neighborhood (colonia) located in the Cuauhtémoc borough of Mexico City. It is bounded by Eje 3 Sur to the north, Avenida Cuauhtémoc to the west, Viaducto Miguel Alemán to the south, and Eje Central Lázaro Cárdenas to the east. Historically, the neighborhood has been recognized for its concentration of businesses dedicated to the sale of automobile parts and accessories, an economic activity that became established during the mid-20th century. According to data derived from the 2020 Population and Housing Census, Buenos Aires has an estimated population of 8,002 residents living in approximately 2,718 occupied housing units, with a population density of about 233 inhabitants per hectare. The population consists of long-term residents as well as newcomers attracted by urban renewal processes and the area's growing real estate market.

== Education and recreation ==
The neighborhood contains community, educational, and recreational facilities that serve local residents. One of the most notable facilities is the PILARES "Ratón Macías" community center, inaugurated in 2023 by the Government of Mexico City. The facility includes a professional boxing ring, sports court, digital learning center (Ciberescuela), classrooms, cultural spaces, and fitness areas for older adults. In addition, residents have access to numerous public and private schools located within Buenos Aires and neighboring areas such as Colonia Doctores and Colonia Roma Sur, offering primary, secondary, technical, and higher-level educational programs.

== Sports infrastructure ==
Buenos Aires and its surrounding area feature a variety of sports and recreational facilities, including public spaces, private gyms, boxing schools, and community centers. Major facilities include:

- PILARES Ratón Macías.
- Community sports courts “Centro Deportivo Bicentenario”.
- Private gyms and boxing academies within the neighborhood.
- Recreational and sports facilities located near Colonia Roma Sur and Colonia Doctores.

== Commerce and services ==
The neighborhood's strategic location between Roma Sur, Doctores, Narvarte, and the Centro Médico Nacional Siglo XXI has encouraged the establishment of a broad network of businesses and services. The area includes convenience stores, supermarkets, pharmacies, banks, restaurants, and self-storage facilities. Major retail and convenience chains operating in or around the neighborhood include OXXO, Bodega Aurrera, and other urban retail formats. Traditional economic activity remains closely linked to the automotive parts industry, which continues to represent one of the largest specialized auto-parts commercial corridors in Mexico City.

== Real estate development ==
Since the early 2020s, Buenos Aires has experienced a significant increase in multifamily residential construction and mixed-use developments. This trend has been driven largely by its proximity to Colonia Roma Sur, one of Mexico City's most sought-after residential neighborhoods, as well as its excellent transportation connectivity through major avenues and Metro stations. Several residential projects have been launched since 2023, contributing to rising property values and attracting new investors and residents. Media reports have identified this process as part of the broader real estate expansion spreading from Roma, Condesa, and Narvarte into traditionally working-class areas of the Cuauhtémoc borough.

This real estate boom has also generated local debate regarding urban densification, water availability, and pressure on existing infrastructure.

== Transportation ==
Buenos Aires has direct access to the Mexico City Metro system through two stations located along its boundaries: Centro Médico (Lines 3 and 9) and Lázaro Cárdenas (Line 9). These stations provide convenient connectivity to major commercial, employment, healthcare, and educational districts across the city. The presence of these Metro stations has contributed to the neighborhood's growing residential attractiveness and has supported recent real estate development by improving accessibility for residents and workers.

== Used auto parts ==
Colonia Buenos Aires, located in the Cuauhtémoc borough of Mexico City, is widely recognized as one of the city's main centers for the sale of auto parts and automotive supplies. The area is home to numerous businesses that sell new, used, and rebuilt vehicle components.

However, the neighborhood has also attracted attention from authorities due to investigations into the possible sale of auto parts originating from stolen vehicles. During 2025, several law enforcement operations were carried out in local businesses, resulting in the seizure of large quantities of auto parts and the closure of some establishments.

Security experts and public officials consider the fight against illegal auto parts markets to be an important strategy for reducing vehicle theft, since many stolen parts are later resold through informal distribution channels. In addition, the Cuauhtémoc borough recorded one of the highest rates of auto parts theft in Mexico City during 2024,2025 and 2026.

== Sacurity ==
Buenos Aires has experienced gradual improvements in its urban environment in recent years as a result of community development programs, public space investments, and expanded educational, cultural, and recreational services.

While the neighborhood has historically been associated with the automotive parts trade and faced urban safety challenges common to high-activity commercial districts, it is now generally considered comparable to other central neighborhoods within the Cuauhtémoc borough.

Local authorities continue to implement crime-prevention initiatives, public safety measures, and community programs, while projects such as the PILARES “Ratón Macías” community center and new residential developments have contributed to improving quality of life and strengthening neighborhood cohesion.

As in many densely populated urban areas, property-related offenses such as theft from pedestrians, vehicle theft, and commercial burglary remain among the most common reported crimes and continue to be addressed through citywide public security strategies.

== Panteón Francés de la Piedad ==
The neighborhood contains the Panteón Francés de la Piedad (French Cemetery of Piety) which was founded by Maximilian I in the 19th century. Today, this cemetery is mostly abandoned and quiet, even on Day of the Dead, when most Mexican families visit family graves. Many are tombs over 100 years old, abandoned. Some remain works of art but others are totally destroyed. The grounds are not kept. The remains of Francisco I. Madero, José María Pino Suárez, Emilio Portes Gil, Javier Torres Adalid, Mariano Escobedo and José Revueltas are buried here.

The cemetery was used mostly by the well-to-do and many of the graves have Art Nouveau designs. Those with the means would have large gravestones, small buildings and/or sculptures on the gravesites. Many of the sculptures refer to death, fragility and the brevity of life. Some were done by an Italian sculptor named Ponzanelli. There is also a 100-year-old replica of the Pietà sculpture by Michelangelo. The government of the Cuauhtémoc borough states that the cemetery was closed in 1924; however, Oaxacan writer Andrés Henestrosa was buried here in 2008, which was his wish according to his daughter.
