= María Enriqueta Flores Manzanera =

Former first lady of Mexico

First Lady of Mexico
- In role February 19, 1913 – February 19, 1913
- President: Pedro Lascuráin
- Preceded by: Sara Pérez Romero
- Succeeded by: Emilia Águila de Huerta

Personal details
- Born: June 23, 1872; Durango City, Durango, Mexico
- Died: June 20, 1951 (aged 78); Durango City, Mexico
- Spouse: Pedro Lascuráin (m. 1890; died 1951)

María Enriqueta Flores Manzanera (23 June 1872 – 20 June 1951) was a Mexican woman served as the First Lady of Mexico for less than one hour on February 19, 1913, as the wife of President Pedro Lascuráin, making her the shortest serving first spouse in modern history.

== Personal life ==
She married Pedro José Domingo de la Calzada Manuel María Lascuráin Paredes on 28 January 1891, in Durango City, Durango, Mexico. They were the parents of at least 6 sons and 1 daughter.
