= Verónica Castro, Mexico City =

- Neighborhood of Mexico City
- Location within Greater Mexico City
- Coordinates: 19.5731616°N 99.1297583°W
- Country: Mexico
- Federative Entity: Mexico City
- Municipality: Gustavo A. Madero

Verónica Castro is a small neighborhood (colonia) of Mexico City in the Gustavo A. Madero borough.

== Topography ==
Because of the neighborhood's mountainside location, the narrow streets are steeply inclined and there is a large, rocky hillside space that is undeveloped. Development on these steep hillsides increases the risk of collapse and danger to inhabitants. Consequently residents have built their own masonry retaining walls to help stabilize the hillside.

== Boundaries ==
The northern limit of the colonia is between Calle La Canadá and Calle 21o. de Marzo, where it borders Colonia Malacates Ampilation. The southern limit is Calle Pirules where it borders Colonia Parque Metropolitano. The eastern limit is primarily Calle Alcatraz where it borders Colonia Forestal. The western limit is primarily Calle 20 de Noviembre where it borders Colonia Malacates.

== Namesake ==
The colonia is named after Verónica Castro, an actress with no known relationship to the neighborhood. The residents collectively named the neighborhood for the admired actress.
