= Malacates =

Neighborhood in Mexico City

- Neighborhood of Mexico City
- Location within Mexico City urban area
- Coordinates: 19.576471°N 99.133045°W
- Country: Mexico
- Federative Entity: Mexico City
- Municipality: Gustavo A. Madero

Malacates is the northernmost neighborhood of Mexico City in the Gustavo A. Madero borough, built at the foot of the mountains of the Sierra de Guadalupe. The main draw of Malacates is as an entryway to the Sierra de Guadalupe Protected Natural Area. The buildings here are constructed primarily of concrete block, which is typical of emerging neighborhoods.

== Social Services ==
Centro De Salud Malacates is a health center serving the local community. They have provided water from their cistern to the community in times of shortage. Liconsa has a distribution center in Malacates, providing fortified powdered milk to low-income families.

== Recreation ==
There are several entrances to the Sierra de Guadalupe Protected Natural Area, though the Tokio Entry is the most developed and used.
PILARES Tokio is very modern-looking community center and PILARES Malacates is a small public space, both built by the PILARES (Puntos de Innovación, Libertad, Arte, Educación y Saberes) program, a program dedicated to developing cultural and learning centers in low-income, under-served areas of the city.

== Education ==
Preparatoria "Tokio" is a high school in Malacates Ampliación that contains 14 classrooms, six workshops, a laboratory, administrative facilities, a teachers' room, a sports field and a civic patio.

== Festivals ==
Virgen del Rosario is a yearly celebration mainly enjoyed by the large Zapotec population of the neighborhood, rooted strongly in their Oaxacan traditions.

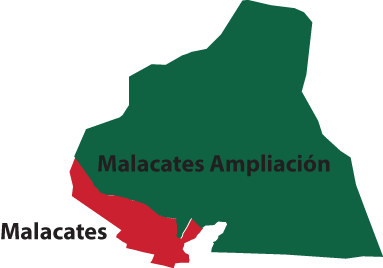
Colonias Malacates and Malacates Ampliación

== Divisions ==
Malacates is divided into two official colonias, with Calle San Pedro forming most of the border between the two.

The original Malacates neighborhood is much smaller and more southern, bordering Colonias Lomas de Cuautepec and Parque Metropolitano to the south, Colonia Verónica Castro to the east, and La Ponderosa section of the Sierra de Guadalupe to the west.

Colonia Malacates Ampliación is a much larger colonia north of the original, surrounded by the Sierra de Guadalupe on the north, east, and west, and bordering original Colonia Malacates and Colonia Verónica Castro to the south.

== Risks ==
In 2003, two residents were killed when the hillside their home was built on collapsed, destroying six homes. Residents had been warned that their homes were in a high-risk area.
