= José Sulaimán =

Mexican boxing official

- José Sulaiman in 1983
- Born: José Sulaimán Chagnón; May 30, 1931; Ciudad Victoria, Tamaulipas, Mexico
- Died: January 16, 2014 (aged 82); Los Angeles, California, U.S.
- Occupation: Boxing official

José Sulaimán Chagnón (May 30, 1931 – January 16, 2014) was a Mexican boxing official. He was the president of the World Boxing Council.

== Biography ==
Sulaimán's father was of Syrian descent and his mother of Lebanese descent and he was born in Ciudad Victoria, Tamaulipas, Mexico. Sulaimán boxed as an amateur and had served as a trainer, promoter, referee, and judge. However, he was best known as an administrator for more than three decades. At the age of 16, he was on the boxing commission in San Luis Potosí, Mexico. In 1968, he joined the World Boxing Council (WBC) and quickly moved through the ranks. On December 5, 1975, Sulaimán was unanimously elected president of the WBC and had served in that capacity until the time of his death.

Under Sulaimán's leadership, the WBC had instituted many new rules and regulations regarding boxers' safety and welfare. Among the changes was the reduction of world championship bouts from 15 rounds to 12, the official weigh-in taking place 24 hours prior to each bout, the creation of intermediate weight divisions, the creation of the World Medical Congress, the introduction of the attached thumb glove and the funding of brain injury research programs at UCLA. During Sulaimán's tenure, the WBC sanctioned over 1,100 title bouts and 300 boxers won world titles. Truly a worldwide organization, Sulaiman had expanded the WBC's global reach to include 161 affiliated nations.

Outside of boxing, Sulaimán, who spoke Spanish, English, Arabic, Italian, Portuguese and French, successfully operated a medical supply company in Mexico.

He was inducted into the International Boxing Hall of Fame on June 10, 2007.

One of his children is the current (2022) president of the WBC, Mauricio Sulaimán.

== Controversies ==
Sulaimán was also a very controversial figure. Journalist Matthew Hurley wrote, "How he was ever voted into the International Boxing Hall Of Fame is beyond me."

Sulaimán had been accused of corruption numerous times. For example, many in the boxing community had accused the WBC of bending its rules to suit promoter Don King. The journalist Jack Newfield wrote that Sulaimán "became more King's junior partner than his independent regulator." Another journalist, Peter Heller, echoed that comment, writing, "Sulaiman ... became little more than an errand boy for Don King." Heller quoted British promoter Mickey Duff as saying, "My complaint is that José Sulaimán is not happy his friend Don King is the biggest promoter in boxing. Sulaiman will only be happy when Don King is the only promoter in boxing."

After Pernell Whitaker lost a controversial decision to Jose Luis Ramirez in 1988, Whitaker's trainer, Lou Duva, called Sulaiman "a thief" and Whitaker's manager, Shelly Finkel, said, "King and Sulaiman fixed the fight, no question about it".

== Death ==
Sulaimán died at the age of 82 in Los Angeles on January 16, 2014. He is buried in the Panteón Francés of Mexico City. He was succeeded by his son Mauricio Sulaimán as president of the WBC.
