= Colonia Tránsito =

Coordinates: 19°25′3.45″N 99°7′44.23″W

- Interactive map of Colonia Tránsito
- Country: Mexico
- City: Mexico City
- Borough: Cuauhtémoc

Population (2023)
  - Total: 9,720

Colonia Tránsito is a colonia or neighborhood in the Cuauhtémoc borough of Mexico City, just south of the city's historic center. It is a residential area although there has been recent redevelopment for more commercial uses. It contains two colonial era churches (one in ruins), a number of buildings containing public offices and it is the home of soft drink maker Pascual Boing.

== Description and landmarks ==
The borders of the colonia are marked by the following streets: Fray Servando Teresa de Mier to the north, Avenida del Taller to the south, Clavijero Street and Calzada de la Viga to the east and Calzada de San Antonio Abad to the west.

The area is home to a number of government offices such as the city department of health on Xocongo Street, the federal Secretaría de Desarrollo Urbano y Vivienda on San Antonio Abad, the administration of prisons. These buildings have attracted a number of protests. Schools in the colonia include Cedex Javier Barros Sierra technical school (public), Cetis Numero 3 technical school (public), El Castillo del Saber preschool (private), Emiliano Zapata preschool (public), Escuelas de Artesanias technical school (public), Instituto ICEL technical school (public), Instituto Mexico Contemporaneo primary school (private), Joaquin Garcia Icazbalceta middle school (public) and Manuel Gutierrez Najera preschool (private).

One major business is the Cooperative Pascual, which produces soft drinks under brand names such as Boing. The facilities occupy two city blocks where the company was founded and it employs 2,000 workers in Mexico City. These two blocks and the water wells on them, have been the center of a legal dispute since the 1980s.

== History ==
Before it was subdivided into family housing, most of the land here was part of the De la Paz colonia, which extended from Fray Servando Teresa de Mier to the Piedad River. The oldest colonial building of the area was the San Antonio Abad church and hospital, built in 1530 by Alonso Sanchez. Eventually, the complex was abandoned and fell into ruins although remnants that date from the 18th century can still be seen. However, the rest was redeveloped. The Calzada de San Antonio Abad was named after this complex.

One of the oldest establishments in the area is the Santa Cruz de Acatlán Church, as the original was built in 1637. It originally was a chapel called Santa Cruz de Acatlan de los Rastreros. When Mexico City was divided into thirteen parishes in 1772, this chapel became a parish. In the 19th century, the adjoining cemetery was secularized then eventually closed by the government, but the church itself was restored.

The corner of Clavijero and Fray Servando Teresa de Mier was a railroad station called San Rafael-Atlixco, but it no longer exists.

Areas of the colonia have been recently redeveloped for parking, road expansion and new housing as the area becomes less residential and more urbanized. This has caused the relocation of families, sometimes under protest.
