= La Guadalupita (Xochimilco) =

Coordinates: 19°11′N 99°00′W

La Guadalupita is a neighborhood in the municipality of Xochimilco, in the southern part of Mexico City. The area was referred to as Las Ánimas or Place of the Souls until its official foundation during Mexico’s colonial period. Residents celebrated its patroness saint, the Virgin Mary, on December 12, in the church of San Bernardino de Siena, located in the nearby neighborhood of Santa Crucita, only until the completion of their own chapel, in 1927.
