= Colonia Pensil =

Settlement in Mexico

Coordinates: 19°27′02″N 99°11′49″W

Colonia Pensil (colloquially known as La Pensil) is a colonia located in the Miguel Hidalgo borough of Mexico City. The area comprises two colonias: Pensil Norte and Pensil Sur.
