= Fernando Lizzi =

Italian civil engineer

- Born: January 2, 1914; Castelnuovo di Porto, Lazio, Italy
- Died: August 28, 2003 (aged 89); Naples, Campania, Italy
- Occupation: civil engineer
- Known for: Father of micropile technology

Fernando Lizzi (January 2, 1914 – August 28, 2003) was an Italian civil engineer. He is considered the father of micropile technology.

He was born in Castelnuovo di Porto, Lazio, Italy on January 2, 1914 and lived in Naples for most of his childhood. At the age of 18 he went to Turin Military Academy where he graduated as a lieutenant by the age of 22. After graduation, he was sent to serve in Tripoli. He was wounded and taken as a prisoner of war during the World War II, studying civil engineering during his captivity. In 1946 he returned to Naples and got his diploma with summa cum laude.

Dr. Lizzi started to work for the company SACIF in 1947, but shortly afterwards was the first (and for some time, the only) civil engineer of the newly formed company, Fondedile, where he remained as Technical Director for nearly 50 years. During this time while, Italy specifically, and Europe generally, were being reconstructed, he developed the technology later named pali radice (root pile, micropile) for the restoration of damaged monuments and buildings at the Scuola Angiulli in Naples. The first international application of micropiles was seen in Germany in 1952 for the underpinning of Krupp, in Essen-Bochum and then the Kerkini Dam in Greece. The technique was later applied in hundreds of works by Fondedile in various countries. Pali radice have been used extensively in the restoration of monuments, e.g. Ponte Vecchio in Florence in 1966 and the stabilization of the Leaning Tower of Burano in Venice. He died in Naples on August 28, 2003.

== Sources ==
- Restauro statico dei Monumenti (1981), The static restoration of monuments (1982) ISBN 88-7058-025-3
- Il consolidamento del terreno e dei fabbricati (1989), Editor Dario Flaccovio
