= Panteón Francés =

Historic cemetery in Mexico City, Mexico

Coordinates: 19°24′19″N 99°09′13″W

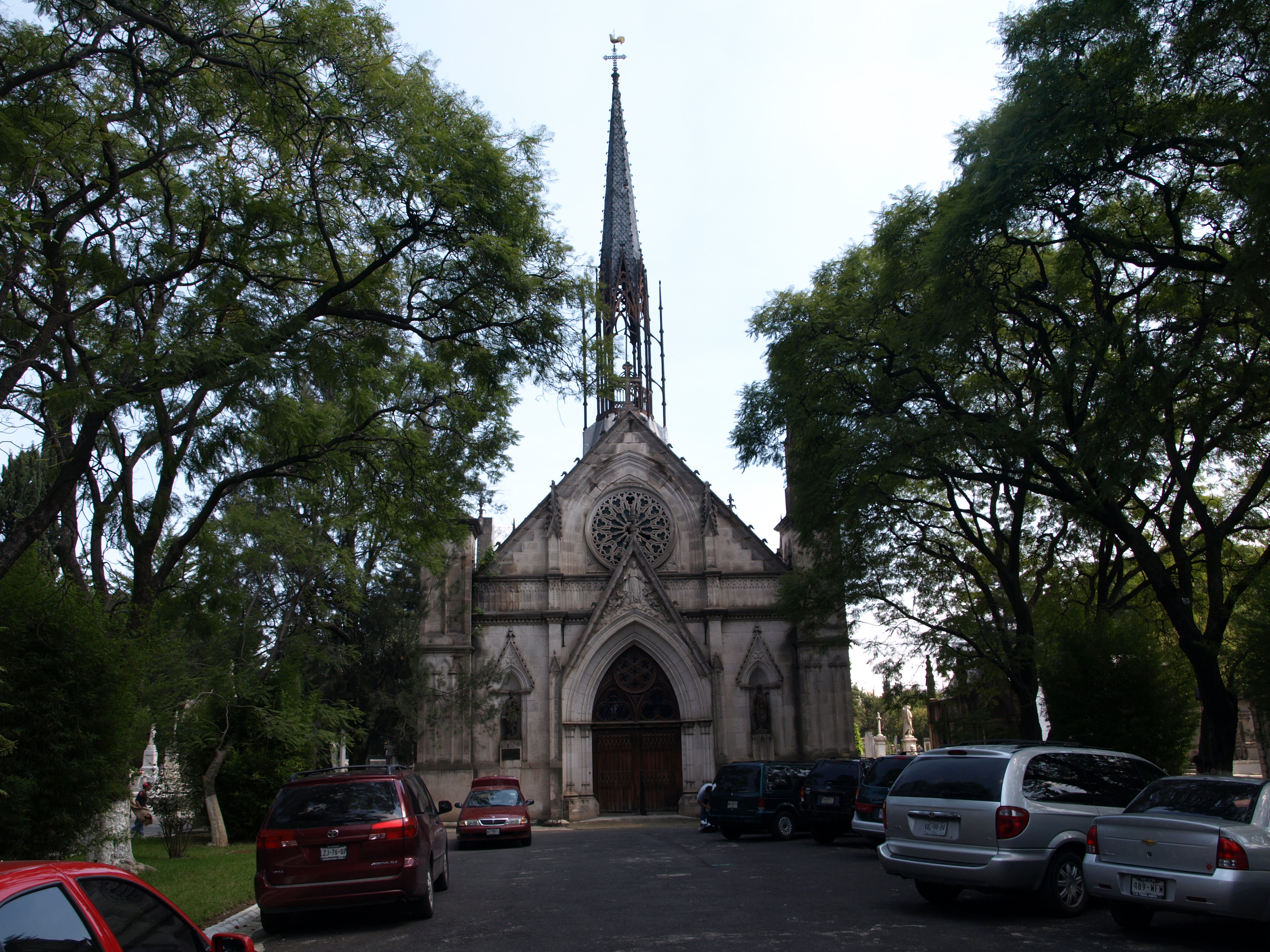
The main chapel

The Panteón Francés de la Piedad ("French Cemetery of the Mercy") is a cemetery in Mexico City in which several notable people are interred. It is located in the southern section of the city, adjacent to the medical center, the Centro Medico Metro station, and the Colonia Buenos Aires neighborhood.

== Notable burials ==
- Pedro Amaro – brother of General Joaquín Amaro Domínguez and former Secretary of War of Mexico
- Ricardo Flores Magón – political activist during the Mexican Revolution
- Mauricio Garcés – actor and comedian
- Roberto Gómez Bolaños – humorist, more commonly known by his pseudonym Chespirito
- María Félix – film actress and singer
- Amalia Hernández – leader of the Ballet Folklorico de Mexico
- Alfonso Ortiz Tirado – doctor and opera singer
- José Revueltas – writer
- Carmen Romero Rubio – wife of Porfirio Díaz and First Lady of Mexico
- José Sulaimán – boxing official, president of the World Boxing Council
- Miguel Zacarías – film director
