= Guillermo Ceniceros =

Mexican painter and muralist (born 1939)

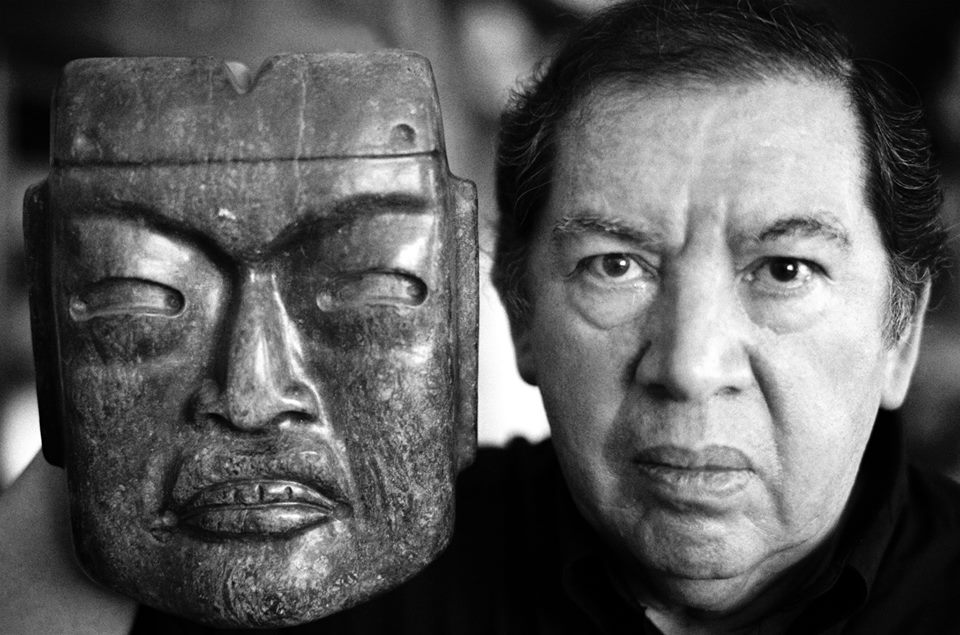
- Born: May 7, 1939 (age 87); El Salto Durango, Mexico
- Known for: Painting, Muralism
- Movement: Modernism, Neo-figurativism, Mexican Muralism
- Awards: National Painting Prize (1969)
- Website: Official website of Guillermo Ceniceros

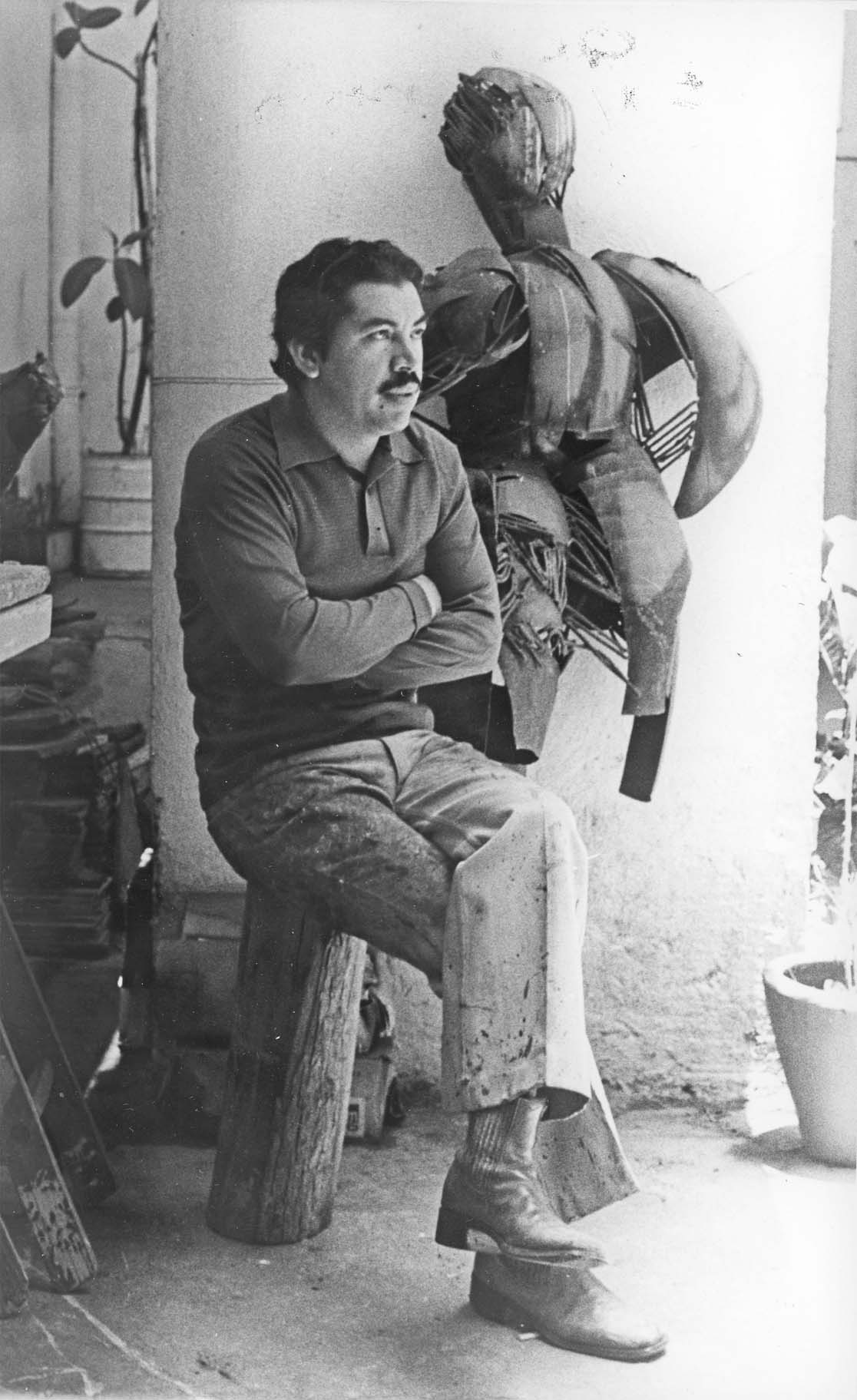
Guillermo Ceniceros in the studio

Guillermo Ceniceros (born May 7, 1939) is a Mexican painter and muralist, best known for his mural work in Mexico City, as well as his figurative easel work. He began his mural painting career as an assistant to mural painters such as Federico Cantú, Luis Covarrubias and then David Alfaro Siqueiros who was a mentor and a key influence. Ceniceros is the most notable of Siqueiros' assistants. While he has experimented with abstract expression, his easel work mostly classifies as figurativism and is influenced by the geometrical construct of Mexican muralism. He has had over 300 individual and collective exhibitions in Mexico and the International stage. His work has been recognized by the Mexican Ministry of Culture and several of its institutions. He has painted over 20 large scale Mural Paintings with some of the most notable being the large scale work for the Legislative Palace of San Lazaro (Mexico's Legislative Building) as well as his murals in the Metro Subway System. He is a member of the Salón de la Plástica Mexicana. In 1995, the State of Durango, Ceniceros' native state, opened to the public the Guillermo Ceniceros Art Museum within the oversight of the Ministry of Culture. Ceniceros has been reviewed by notable critics such as Berta Taracena, Raquel Tibol, Alaide Foppa, Graciela Kartofel, José Angel Leyva and Eduardo Blackaller among others. There are several publications about his work including a vast review of his art life endeavors developed by the Ministries of Culture of Durango and Nuevo León. He is married to the artist Esther González and lives in his studio house in the Colonia Roma of Mexico City.

== Life ==
Interview with the subject

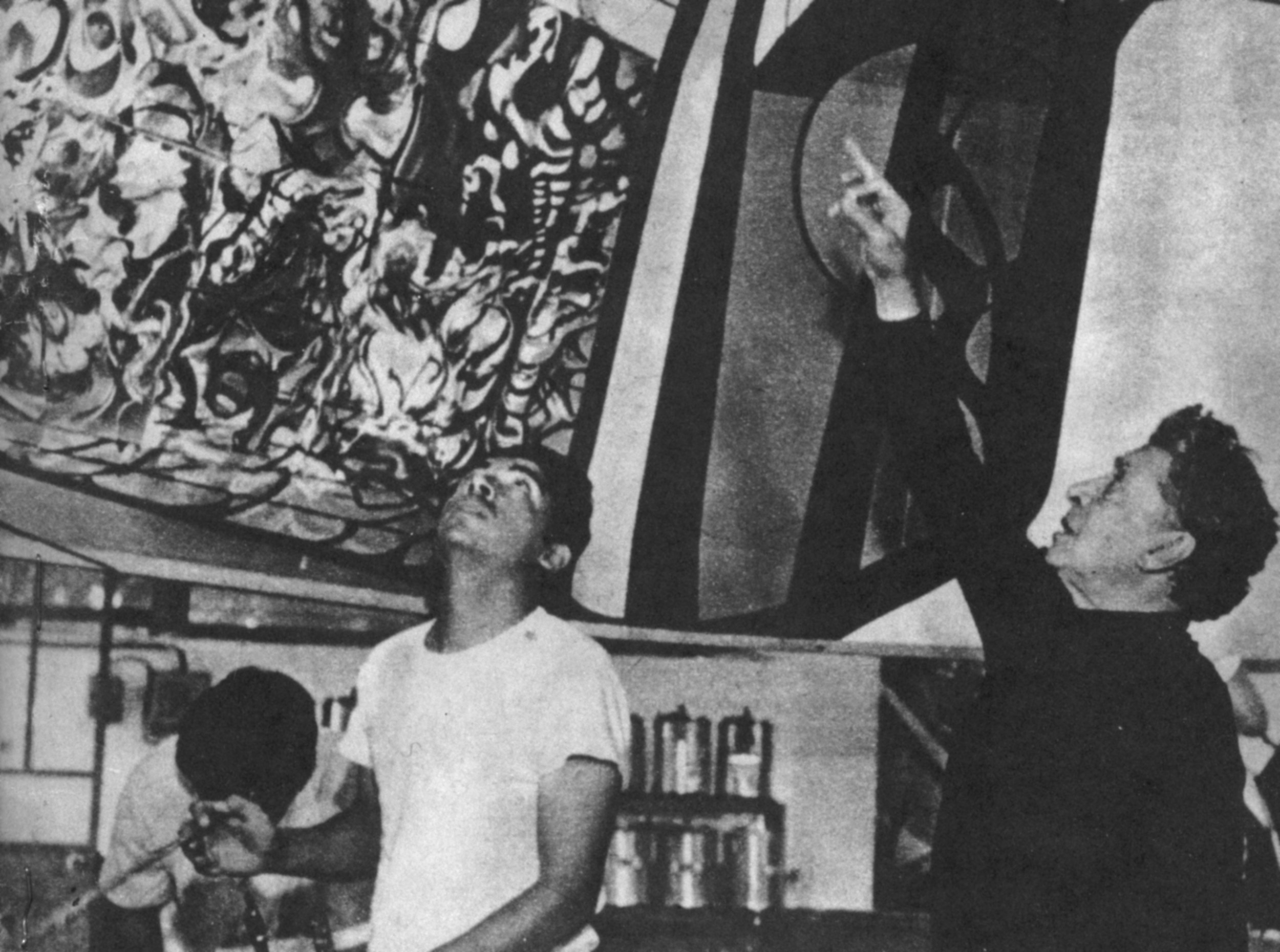
Ceniceros and Siqueiros

Ceniceros was born in a small village called El Salto, located in the municipality of Pueblo Nuevo in the Mexican state of Durango. His father was a woodworker who made toys and furniture in his workshop. His father's shop would become an influence in Ceniceros' life long interest in developing his own innovative working tools. When he was twelve the family moved to Monterrey to seek better economic opportunities. There he attended school and when he was fourteen he entered the Fabricación de Máquinas, S.A. (FAMA), a school/business, where he studied industrial drawing. He considers this early training important as it taught him the importance of geometry, use of space and materials. While at FAMA he met painters Gerardo Cantú and Ignacio Ortiz, and collaborated with them on sketches for publications of Alfonso Reyes, Pedro Garfias and other notable writers.

In 1955, he enrolled in the Taller de Artes Plásticas at the Universidad Autónoma de Nuevo León, graduating in 1958. At the Taller he met fellow Mexican artist Esther González, whom he married and with whom he has two children.

In 1962 he moved to Mexico City with the goal of working in the Taller of the Maestro David Alfaro Siqueiros. He became Siqueiros' first assistant working on his last murals while at the same time working at night on his easel painting work. Siqueiros supported Ceniceros decision to leave his Taller and supported him in his career until his death in 1974. By then Ceniceros was already a break thru artist having had several individual exhibitions including the prestigious Palacio De Bellas Artes as well as other recognitions. Thru the 70's and 80s Ceniceros continued his work with an emphasis on exhibits and exchanges abroad and traveling to Eastern Europe, Cuba, China, Chile, Ecuador, Italy and the United States. His Mexico City contemporaries and circle would include names that today have become reference such as Sebastian, José Luis Cuevas, Gilberto Aceves Navarro, Benjamin Dominguez, Gustavo Arias Murueta, Byron Galvez, Leonel Maciel among others. In the 70's his Row-House neighbors in the colonia Roma were Francisco Toledo and Alejandro Jodorowski.

His focus on mural painting is renewed in the mid 80's thru his large scale work in the Metro Subway System with him working on major commissions consistently and into the new century. While the Mexican school of Muralism had been challenged by the Ruptura members, the interest in Mural painting as a unique national form of expression continues.

He lives in Mexico City at a studio/home in the Colonia Roma. His home is a frequent gathering place for writers, poets, painters, singers, actors and journalists. He has a strong interest in Spanish language literature. Juan Rulfo who visited Ceniceros' studio several times stated that a number of Ceniceros’ landscapes were reminiscent of the world of Pedro Páramo . The late poet Luis Rius and Ceniceros often discussed the parallels between painting and writing, with Ceniceros expressing his goal of achieving visual poetry thru his work.

== Career ==
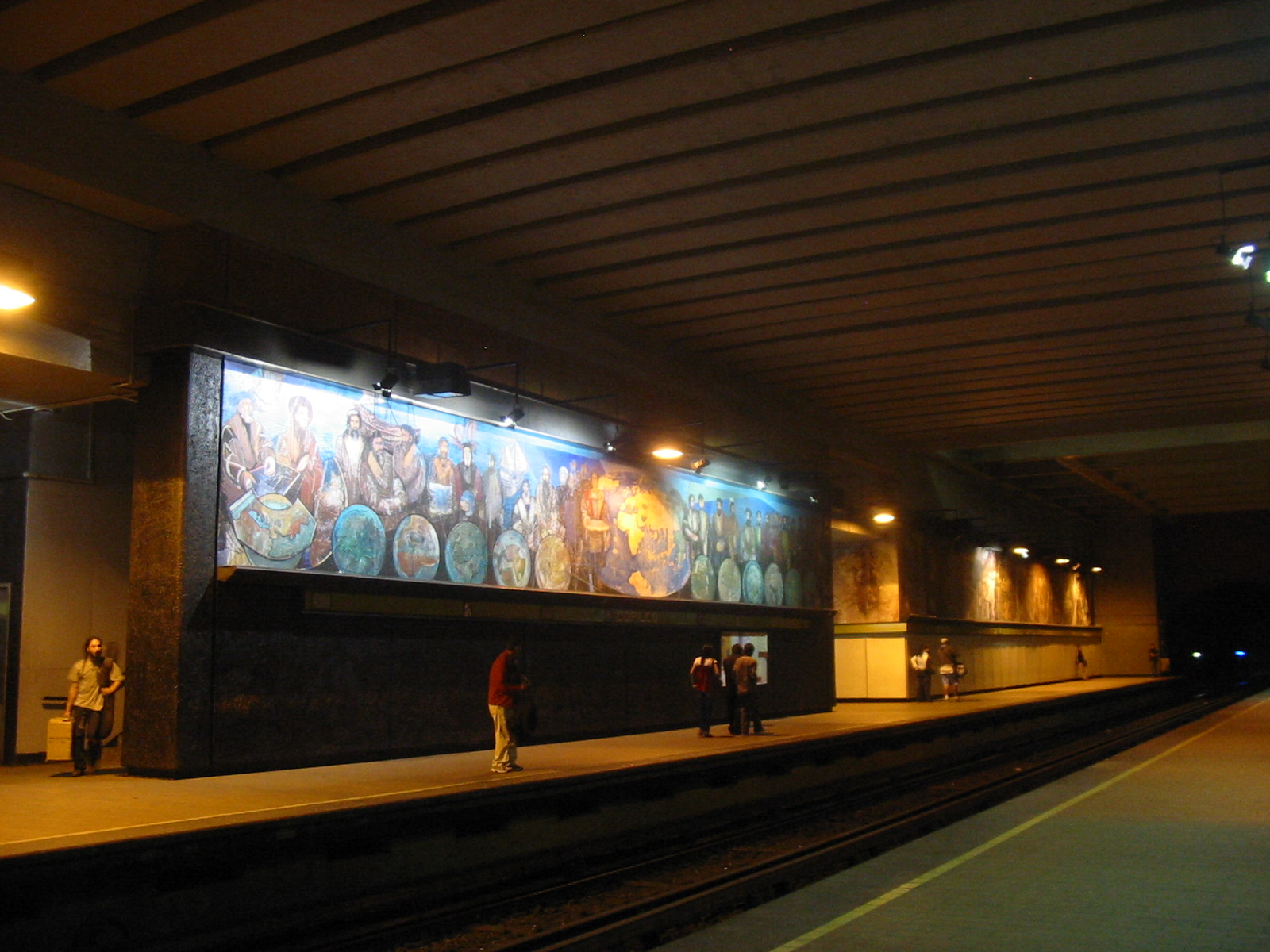
Mural work at Metro Copilco

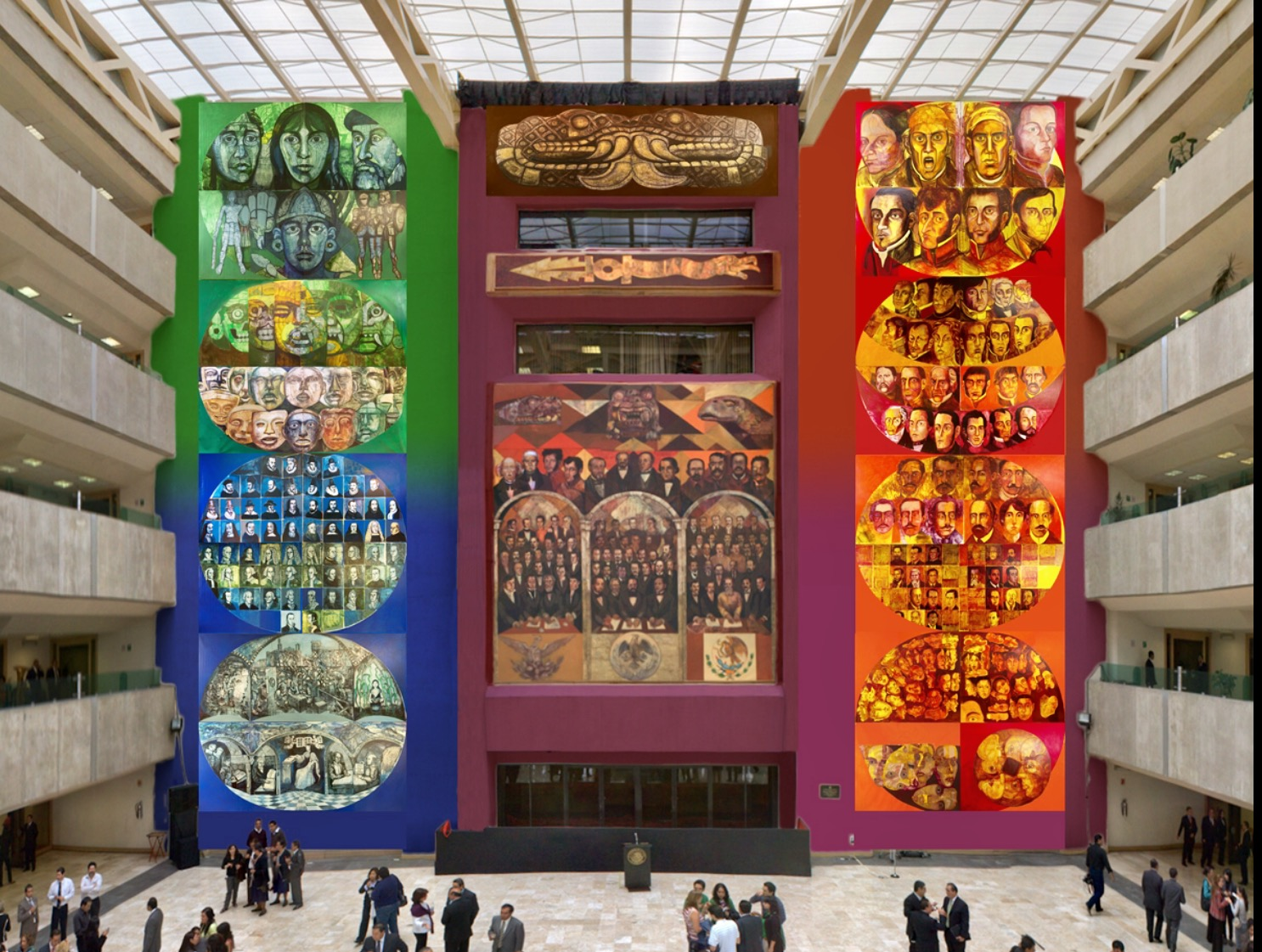
Ceniceros Mural at the Palacio Legislativo in Mexico City

Ceniceros did his first mural while he was still in Monterrey, working on the La Ciudadela municipal library in the city. However, much of his early experience with the art form was as an assistant to established artists. Federico Cantú hired him as an assistant with the 600m2 mural work at the Sierra de los Altares, a relief work made with natural stone. This led to work two years later with Luis Covarrubias to paint ethnographic murals at the Museo Nacional de Antropología. During this project he was able to meet Rufino Tamayo, José Chávez Morado, Jorge González Camarena and Raúl Anguiano . In 1965, he was then hired by David Alfaro Siqueiros, working on murals such as The March of Humanity on Earth and Towards the Cosmos at the Polyforum Cultural Siqueiros . He then also worked with the master on murals at the Museo Nacional de Historia at Chapultepec Castle, the former customs building in Santo Domingo and the site of the Asociación Nacional de Actores. The work with Siqueiros was a major influence on his development, introducing him to new techniques, materials, tools, compositions and perspectives. The idea of inventing one’s own tools he got from Siqueira. Ceniceros would become one of Siqueros most notable apprentices.

He has created over twenty large scale murals in public places. The Centro de Arte Moderno, Guadalajara (1980), the Mexican Mission to the United Nations (1984), Metro Tacubaya (1986), The Ancient Mexicans, a mural for the Mexican Pavilion at the International Exhibition in Vancouver, Canada. (1986), Metro Copilco (1988), Maderos Theater UANL (1990), the Palacio de Justicia in Monterrey (1991), Banco Nacional de Comercio Exterior, Monterrey (1994), the Chemistry department at UANL (1998), Santa Engracia Hospital in Monterrey (1999) and the Theatre of the Sindicato Nacional de Trabajadores Telefónicos in Mexico City (2001), Metáforos Lúdicas in the city of Durango (2008) and La Historia del Pueblo Mexicano a través de su Vida Constitucional at the Palacio Legislativo to commemorate the Bicentennial of Independence and Centennial of the Mexican Revolution (2012) . He also painted a mural for the cultural center of his hometown of El Salto.

Ceniceros had his first exhibition of artwork in 1956 at the Galería de Arte, A.C. in 1956. His work began to be shown regularly in 1969 with an exhibition that established him at the Palacio de Bellas Artes, with shows eventually in various parts of Mexico as well as abroad in countries such as Cuba, Ecuador and Eastern Europe with over two hundred exhibitions as of 2003. In 1970, he exhibited at the Museo de Arte Moderno, winning the Salón Annual de la Plástica Mexicana Prize. The museum bought the piece. Other significant ones include the Martin Gallery in Minneapolis (1972), the Museo Nacional de Bellas Artes de La Habana (1972), the Museo Nacional de Bellas Artes in Santiago de Chile (1973), the Museo Guayasamín in Quito (1976), the Atelier Guayasamín in Caracas (1976), the Pulchri Studio in The Hague (1980), International Development Bank Gallery in Washington (1984), Iturralde Gallery in La Jolla, CA (1989), Museo Universitario de Ciencias y Artes (1992) and the Nagoya City Art Museum, Japan (1994) .

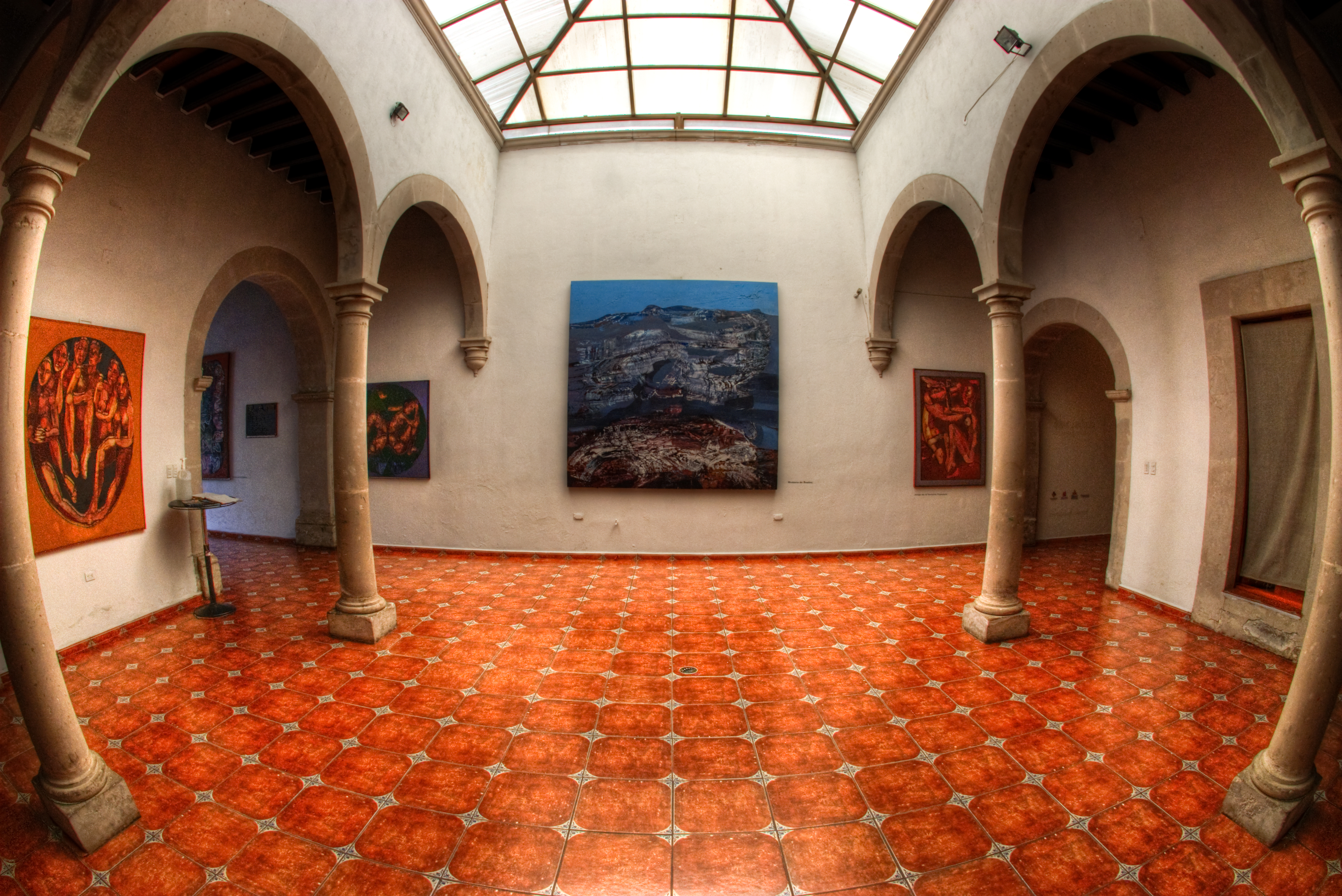
View of the Ceniceros museum

His recognitions include two awards, the National Painting Prize from the Secretaría de Educación Pública in 1969 and the keys to the city of Durango as a distinguished visitor in 2008. In 1998, the state of Durango accepted a donation of paintings from the artist and sponsored the establishment of the Museo de Arte Moderno Guillermo Ceniceros in the capital. It occupies the main house of the former Hacienda Ferrería de Flores, which dates to the 19th century. Five halls are dedicated to the permanent collection with the other four dedicated to temporary exhibits. In 2009, for his seventieth birthday, the states of Durango and Nuevo León sponsored the production of his biography, called Guillermo Ceniceros: setenta años, published by La Cabra Ediciones. He is also a member of the Salón de la Plástica Mexicana.

== Artistry ==
Two major influences in his work are the training he received in industrial drawing in Monterrey, and his experience as an assistant to Siqueiros. Both helped him to form a sense of geometry, composition, a definition of form and with Siqueiros, a commitment to retaining aspects of figurativism from Mexican muralism.

Two elements that frequently appear in his work are landscapes and the female figure, with figures often created using geometric patterns. He experimented with abstract art, but always went back to introducing human figures in his work. However this introduced the idea of fusing elements of Mexican nationalist art with abstract work. These depictions are what gave his work the most notice, with critics such as Raquel Tibol particularly impressed with his female nudes, which are generally have an introspective quality but not sad or melancholy.

His work is marked by subtlety. Raquel Tibol describes his work as neither aggressive or harsh, rather as having a voice which is enveloping and gentle. The figures and landscapes generally interact to give the works an element of mystery and Expressionism. The backgrounds tend to have geometric relationships, visual proportions, and unique textures.

He is interested more in formal possibilities than in techniques. He believes that the ability to draw is the basis of art. One example of this is a series of “anamorphic” drawings with the aid of a “form detector,” a cylindrical mirror which was invented over 400 years ago that forces the artist to draw lines that acquire representative sense only when they are reflected in the mirror. He has created and invented many of the tools he works with.
