= Lizzi Ceniceros =

Mexican pianist and orchestra director

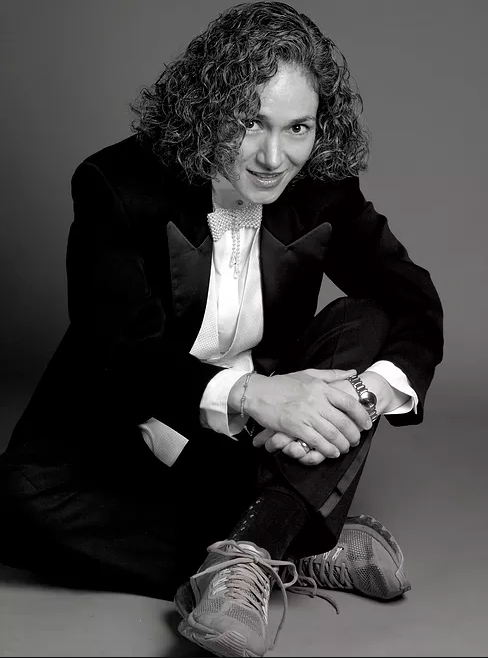
- Born: Rocío Elizabeth Ceniceros Mirabal; April 22, 1973 (age 51); Mexico City, Mexico
- Occupation(s): Pianist, orchestra director
- Website: www.lizziceniceros.com

Rocío Elizabeth Ceniceros Mirabal (born April 22, 1973), better known as Lizzi Ceniceros, is a Mexican pianist and orchestra director.

== Biography ==
Lizzi Ceniceros was born in Mexico City on April 22, 1973. She began her musical studies at age 12, and began to lead choirs and musical ensembles five years later. In 2000, she founded the Salesian Youth Orchestra, which she continues to conduct.

She is the founding partner and director of the Counterpoint Business Group Council, and co-founder of the Manos a la Obra foundation. In 2019, she founded and directed the Ibero-American Orchestra.

She is director of the Mexico Counterpoint Orchestra, which participated in the Eurochestries Festival in Quebec, Canada in 2016, and in Jonzac, France in 2018. She was in charge of the Chamber Orchestra of Mexico City from 2014 to 2018. She has directed the Limón Concert Band and the Alajuela Concert Band in Costa Rica, the Symphony Orchestra of El Salvador, and the National Choir with Beethoven's Ninth Symphony, as well as the youth orchestras of the Choir and Orchestra System of El Salvador.

She is the founder and director of the Guadalupano Children's Boarding Choir.

In 2019, she appeared in the Yorgos Lanthimos short film Nimic.

== Awards and recognition ==
- "Mexico in Your Hands" Award (2016)
- Baton Award of Mexico (2019)
