= Madero =

Madero may refer to:

== People ==
- Abel Sierra Madero (born 1976), Cuban author and scholar
- Adalberto Madero (born 1969), Mexican lawyer and politician
- Alberto Madero (1923–2011), Argentine rower
- Eduardo Madero (1823–1894), Argentine merchant, banker and developer
- Emilio Madero (1880–1962), Mexican officer during the Mexican Revolution
- Ernesto Madero (1872–1958), Mexican banker and politician
- Francisco Bernabé Madero (1816–1896), Argentine lawyer and politician
- Francisco I. Madero (1873–1913), Mexican president, writer and revolutionary
- Gustavo A. Madero (1875–1913), participant in the Mexican Revolution against Porfirio Díaz
- Gustavo Madero Muñoz (born 1955), a Mexican politician and businessman
- José Francisco Madero (died 1833), Mexican surveyor and land commissioner
- Miguel Madero (1896–?), Argentine rowing coxswain
- Pablo Emilio Madero (1921–2007), Mexican politician
- Priscilla Madero (born 1976), Ecuadorian swimmer
- Rafael Madero (born 1958), Argentine rugby union player and coach
- Raúl Madero (footballer) (1939–2021), Argentine footballer and sports physician
- Raúl Madero (politician) (1888–1982), Mexican politician and military personnel

== Places ==
- Ciudad Madero, a city in the Mexican state of Tamaulipas
- Ciudad Madero, Argentina, in the province of Buenos Aires
- Francisco I. Madero, Coahuila, a city in the Mexican state of Coahuila
- Gustavo A. Madero, Mexico City, a municipality of Mexico City
- Puerto Madero, a district of Buenos Aires, Argentina
- Villa Madero, a city in the Mexican state of Michoacán

== See also ==
- Madero Center, a building in Puerto Madero, Buenos Aires
- Madero Street, a pedestrian street in Mexico City
- Madeira (disambiguation)
- Madera (disambiguation)
