= Raúl Madero =

Raúl Madero may refer to:

- Raúl Madero (politician) (1888-1982), Mexican revolutionary military and politician
- Raúl Madero (footballer) (1939-2021), Argentine footballer and later physician
