= Madera =

Madera is the Spanish word for lumber. It may also refer to:

== Places ==
=== Americas ===
- Madera County, California, in the United States
  - Madera, California, the county seat of Madera County
  - Madera Peak, a mountain in Madera County
  - Madera Ranchos, California, an unincorporated community in Madera County
  - Madera AVA, a wine region partially located in Madera County
- Madera Municipality, in Mexico
  - Madera, Chihuahua, the municipal seat
- La Madera, Rio Arriba County, New Mexico
- La Madera, Sandoval County, New Mexico
- Madera, Pennsylvania

=== Europe ===
- Madera, Kuyavian-Pomeranian Voivodeship (north-central Poland)
- Madera, Łódź Voivodeship (central Poland)
- Madera, Pomeranian Voivodeship (north Poland)
- Paterna del Madera, Albacete, Spain

== Train stations ==
- Madera station (Amtrak), a train station in Madera, California
  - Storey station, a closed train station referred by Amtrak as "Madera"
- Madera station (California High-Speed Rail), a proposed train station
- Madera station (Medellín), a metro station in Colombia

== People with the surname ==
- Kasia Madera (born 1974), English journalist
- Lupe Madera (1952–2005), Mexican boxer

== Businesses ==
- Madera (restaurant), a Michelin-starred restaurant in Menlo Park, California

== Insect ==
- Madera, extinct genus of insects in the order Palaeodictyoptera

== See also ==
- Madeira (disambiguation)
- Madero (disambiguation)
