= Raúl Madero (politician) =

Mexican politician (1888-1982 )

Raúl Madero González
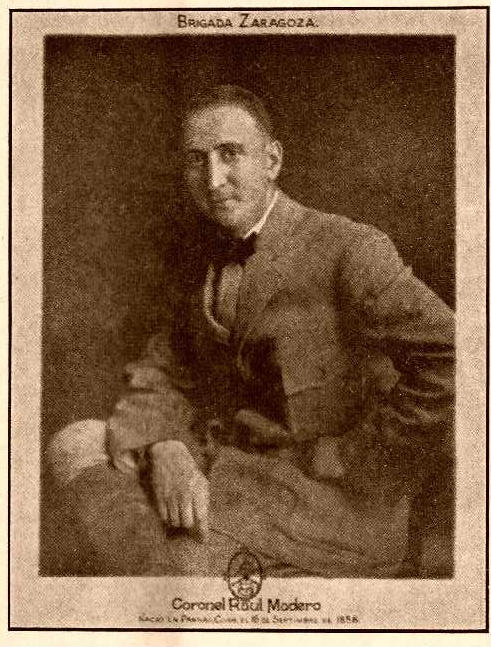
- Raúl Madero, c. 1920
- Born: 16 September 1888; Parras, Coahuila, Mexico
- Died: 8 October 1982 (aged 94); Mexico City
- Occupations: politician, military officer, and mining engineer
- Children: 11
- Parent(s): Francisco Madero Hernández (father); Mercedes González Treviño (mother)
- Relatives: brothers; Francisco I. Madero; Emilio Madero; Gustavo A. Madero; Gabriel Madero; Evaristo Madero; Julio Madero; uncle; Ernesto Madero

Raúl Miguel Hidalgo Madero González (Parras de la Fuente, Coahuila, 16 September 1888 – Mexico City, Federal District, 8 October 1982) was a prominent Mexican revolutionary military and politician, brother of the hero of the Mexican Revolution. He was the brother of Francisco I. Madero and businessman and politician Gustavo A. Madero.

After the death of President Francisco Madero, Madero joined the forces of General Francisco Villa, with whom he participated for almost the entire rest of the revolutionary stage. He was governor of Nuevo León at this time, and in subsequent years he was governor of Coahuila.

== Mexican Revolution ==
Despite his wealth, in 1910 he joined the revolutionary movement in San Antonio, Texas, headed by his brother Francisco I. Madero, and acted as one of his closest collaborators. In the armed struggle he held the position of secretary treasurer and on 9 February 1911 he was awarded the rank of Major. He fought with the rank of Captain in the Battle of Casas Grandes in mid-April 1911. Accompanying Peppino Garibaldi, and at the head of a column of 800 men, he defeated Lieutenant Colonel Pueblita at Bauche. He participated in the taking of Ciudad Juárezin May 1911.

Once Francisco I. Madero became president of the country, Raúl held various military commissions; He participated with Francisco Villa in the fight against the split of Pascual Orozco, integrating the Carabineros de Nuevo León group with 300 men to fight the Orozquista rebellion. With the rank of Lieutenant Colonel, he was part of the brigade commanded by his brother Emilio Madero, a Brigadier attached to the Northern Division, which was sent against the Orozquistas under the command of General Victoriano Huerta.

He was present in the battles of Tlahualilo (9 May) and Conejos (12 May), in Durango and those of Rellano, La Cruz, and Bachimba. In Chihuahua, he commanded 10,000 armed men. Together with Guillermo Rubio Navarrete, Madero obtained a pardon for Villa from his brother, the president, since Victoriano Huerta had ordered him shot for alleged insubordination.

After the assassination of his brother, President Francisco I. Madero, in 1913, Raúl Madero joined the constitutionalist movement headed by Venustiano Carranza in San Pedro de las Colonias, the Zaragoza brigade, commanded by Colonel Eugenio Aguirre Benavides. He participated in the Battle of Tierra Blanca, being promoted to Colonel for merits in the campaign. Felipe Ángeles and Francisco Villa, who were fighting against Luís Medina Barrón and Benjamín Argumedo, were also along with Carranza.

Madero took Ojinaga on 10 January 1914. He fought in the battle and capture of Torreón from 27 March to 2 April of the cited year; in Paredón (Coahuila) on 17 May, and in the attack and capture of Zacatecas on 23 June 1914, destroying the Federal Army. At the Aguascalientes Convention, he was part of the Governance commission and voted against Venustiano Carranza. When the revolutionary split occurred, he remained at the side of Francisco Villa, incorporated into the forces of General Felipe Ángeles, fighting the carrancistas Antonio Irineo Villarreal and Luis Gutiérrez in Ramos Arizpe.

In 1915 he was interim governor of Coahuila, and of Nuevo León from February to May of the same year. When Villistas forces seized the city of Monterrey in 1915, Villa himself appointed Raúl Madero to govern Nuevo León.

== Sources ==
- González Morales, Ángel; Rodríguez García, Rubén (1990). Diccionario histórico y biográfico de la revolución mexicana [Historical and Biographical Dictionary of the Mexican Revolution] (in Spanish). México: INEHRM. ISBN 978-968-805-562-5. OCLC 463670260.
- Los Gobernantes de Nuevo León : historia (1579-1989) [The Governors of Nuevo León: history (1579-1989)] (in Spanish). Mexico, D.F.: J.R. Fortson y Cia. 1990. ISBN 978-968-6121-02-5. OCLC 22765206.
