= Emilio Madero =

Soldier in the Mexican Revolution (1880–1962)

General Emilio Madero González
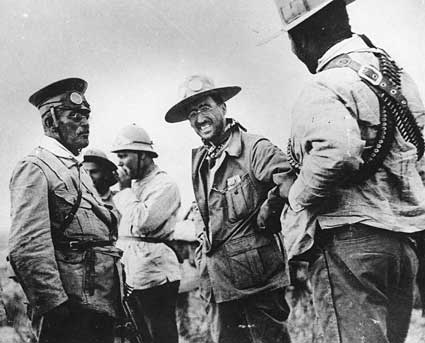
- Madero in 1912. Left to right: Victoriano Huerta, Emilio Madero, and Pancho Villa.
- Born: 8 August 1880; Parras de la Fuente, Coahuila
- Died: 16 January 1962 (aged 81); Mexico City, Federal District
- Spouse: Mercedes Belden Gutiérrez
- Relatives: Brothers: Ernesto Madero; Francisco I. Madero; Gustavo A. Madero; Children: Pablo Emilio Madero
- Military career
- Conflicts: Mexican Revolution

General Emilio Madero González (8 August 1880 – 16 January 1962) was a Mexican soldier who participated in the Mexican Revolution, and the brother of Francisco I. Madero.

== Biography ==
=== Early life ===
Emilio Madero was born in Parras, Coahuila, on 8 August 1880, the sixth son of Francisco Madero Hernández and Mercedes González Treviño. He was the brother of Francisco I. Madero, the leader of the Mexican Revolution.

=== Mexican Revolution ===
He participated in the Madero movement during the Mexican Revolution. In April 1911 he led the forces which conquered the Mexican state of Durango, capturing Mapimí, Lerdo, and Gómez Palacio. In May 1911 he led the assault on Torreón, which was a key location to seizing control of the surrounding area. However, when his Maderistas finally took the city on 15 May, they were joined by a local mob and massacred the city's Chinese residents. Madero finally managed to bring them under control, but not until 10 hours had passed and over 300 Chinese lay dead. He had difficulty maintaining control of the area, though, and in June was forced to form a group of loyal men, who he paid $1.50 a day, to control rebellious former Maderistas. He was then aligned to the División del Norte in 1912 fighting Pascual Orozco under General Victoriano Huerta as a Colonel. During this time he was instrumental in saving Pancho Villa from execution, arguing for his life with Huerta, who wanted him out of the way.

Madero married Mercedes Belden Gutiérrez on 27 January 1913 in Monterrey, Nuevo León. The couple had four children, including Pablo Emilio Madero Belden, who was inspired to go into politics on his father's account.

=== Exile ===
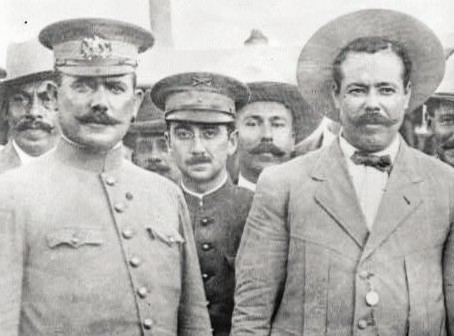
Emilio Madero (center) between Álvaro Obregón (left) and Pancho Villa (right) at Fort Bliss on 27 August 1914

Madero was in San Pedro, Coahuila, with Venustiano Carranza during the Ten Tragic Days in February 1913. Following the death of his brother Francisco, it was reported that he had been shot and killed just north of Monterrey on 26 February; according to rumor he had been overtaken by General Treviño between Villaldama and Bustamante while leading a group of 35 to join a force of rebels in Laredo. The report was declared false the next day. On 6 March, he was forced to flee Mexico with another brother, General Raúl Madero, and the two swore to avenge the President's death.

He had returned to Mexico by August 1914, and was in Chihuahua with Pancho Villa. In early 1915, Madero led 2,000 troops to capture Saltillo under the command of General Felipe Ángeles, later participating in a cavalry charge on 8 January that resulted in the capture of 3,000 prisoners in Ramos Arizpe. Following the appointment of Roque González Garza as President, Madero was made governor of Sinaloa. Later that same year, however, on 12 October 1915, Emilio and Raúl refused to join Villa in waging guerrilla warfare. Madero was still abroad in 1918, and was living in San Antonio.

By 1921 he had returned to Mexico, and was living on a farm in San Pedro. Madero and his family went into exile again in 1926. They spent a year in California and two in Texas before returning to Mexico in 1929.

=== Later life ===
He was the leader of the Revolutionary Party of National Unification until 1940, when he was removed for calling the party "paralyzed" due to lack of communication with leader Juan Andreu Almazán.

Madero died in Mexico City on 16 January 1962, and was buried in the Panteón Francés de la Piedad.
