= Madeira (disambiguation) =

Madeira is an autonomous region of Portugal.

Madeira may also refer to:

== Geography ==
- Madeira, Ohio, a city in the United States
- Madeira Beach, Florida, an American city
- Madeira evergreen forests, a wooded area covering the archipelago of Madeira and some nearby islands
- Madeira Island, the largest of the Madeira group of islands in the Atlantic Ocean
- Madeira Park, an unincorporated community in British Columbia, Canada
- Madeira River, one of the tributaries of the Amazon River in South America

== People ==
- Fernando Madeira (1932–2025), a Portuguese Olympic swimmer and water polo player
- George Madeira (1836–1922), a mining engineer and mineralogist who founded the first astronomical observatory in California
- Jamila Madeira (born 1975), a Portuguese socialist politician and Member of the European Parliament
- Jones P. Madeira (1944 or 1945–2025), a Trinidadian journalist
- Phil Madeira (born 1952), an American songwriter, producer, musician and singer from Nashville, Tennessee

== Arts, entertainment, and media ==
- Have Some Madeira M'Dear, a darkly comic song by Flanders and Swann
- Madeira, the fictionalized name of Debra Newell's interior design firm in the Bravo TV series, Dirty John
- Miss Madeira, a 2011 novel by Austin Gary
- RTP Madeira, a Portuguese TV channel

== Food and wine ==
- Madeira cake, an English cake originating in the 18th Century
- Madeira wine, a fortified wine made on the island of Madeira

== Schools ==
- Madeira School, a private girls' school in the state of Virginia, in the United States
- Universidade da Madeira, a public university in Madeira

== Other uses ==
- C.F. União, an association football club commonly known as União da Madeira
- Madeira (shipwreck), a schooner-barge which sank on the north shore of Lake Superior in November 1905
- Madeira Airport
- Madeira Andebol SAD, a Portuguese handball club

== See also ==
- Madera (disambiguation)
