= Francisco I. Madero =

President of Mexico from 1911 to 1913

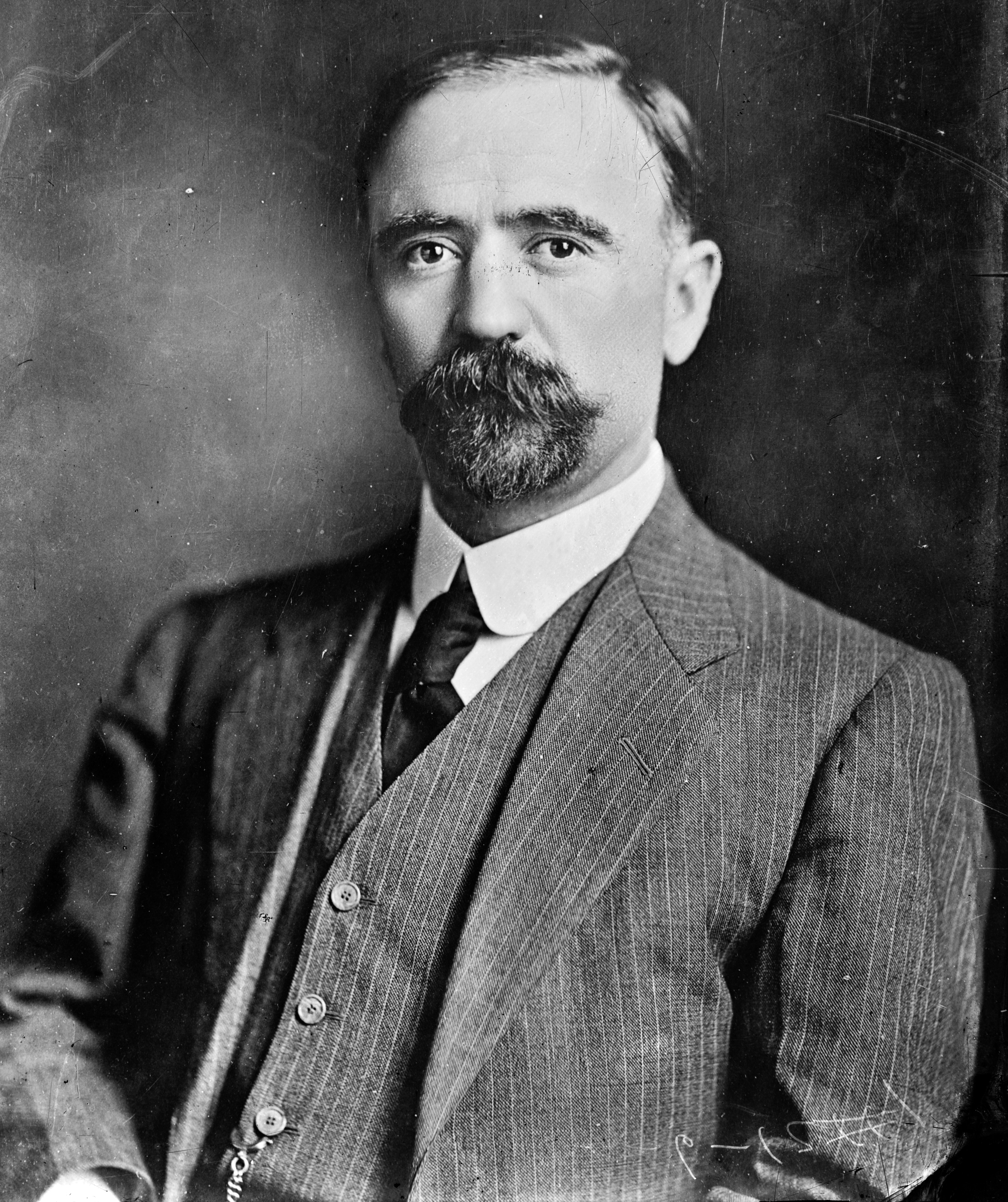
- Madero, c. 1910–13

37th President of Mexico
- In office 6 November 1911 – 19 February 1913
- Vice President: José María Pino Suárez
- Preceded by: Francisco León de la Barra
- Succeeded by: Pedro Lascuráin

Personal details
- Born: Francisco Ignacio Madero González; 30 October 1873 Parras de la Fuente, Coahuila, Mexico
- Died: 22 February 1913 (aged 39) Mexico City, Mexico
- Cause of death: Assassination (gunshot wounds)
- Resting place: Monument to the Revolution, Mexico City
- Party: Progressive Constitutionalist Party (previously the Anti-Reelectionist Party)
- Spouse: Sara Pérez Romero (m. 1903)
- Relations: Brothers; Emilio Madero; Gustavo A. Madero; Raúl Madero; Gabriel Madero; Evaristo Madero; Julio Madero; Uncle; Ernesto Madero
- Parents: Francisco Madero Hernández (father); Mercedes González Treviño (mother)
- Education: Lycée Hoche, Versailles, France
- Alma mater: HEC Paris; University of California, Berkeley
- Profession: Writer; Revolutionary; Statesman; President of Mexico

Francisco Ignacio Madero González (Spanish pronunciation: [fɾanˈsisko jɣˈnasjo maˈðeɾo ɣonˈsales]; 30 October 1873 – 22 February 1913) was a Mexican businessman, revolutionary, writer, politician, and statesman who served as the 37th president of Mexico from 1911 until he was deposed and assassinated in a coup d'état in February 1913. He came to prominence as an advocate for democracy and as an opponent of President and dictator Porfirio Díaz. After Díaz claimed to have won the fraudulent election of 1910 despite promising a return to democracy, Madero started the Mexican Revolution to oust Díaz. The Mexican revolution would continue until 1920, well after Madero and Díaz's deaths, with hundreds of thousands dead.

A member of one of Mexico's wealthiest families, Madero studied business at the École des Hautes Études Commerciales de Paris. An advocate for social justice and democracy, his 1908 book The Presidential Succession in 1910 called for Mexican voters to prevent the reelection of Porfirio Díaz, whose regime had become increasingly authoritarian. Bankrolling the opposition Anti-Reelectionist Party, Madero's candidacy garnered widespread support in the country. He challenged Díaz in the 1910 election, which resulted in his arrest. After Díaz declared himself winner for an eighth term in a rigged election, Madero escaped from jail, fled to the United States, and called for the overthrow of the Díaz regime in the Plan of San Luis Potosí, sparking the Mexican Revolution.

Madero's armed support was concentrated in northern Mexico and was aided by access to arms and finances in the United States. In Chihuahua, Madero recruited wealthy landowner Abraham González to his movement, appointing him provisional governor of the state. González then enlisted Pancho Villa and Pascual Orozco as revolutionary leaders. Madero crossed from Texas into Mexico and took command of a band of revolutionaries, but was defeated in the Battle of Casas Grandes by the Federal Army, which led him to abandon military command roles. Concerned the Battle of Ciudad Juárez would cause casualties in the American city of El Paso and prompt foreign intervention, Madero ordered Villa and Orozco to retreat, but they disobeyed and captured Juárez. Díaz resigned on 25 May 1911 after the signing of the Treaty of Ciudad Juárez and went into exile. Madero retained the Federal Army and dismissed the revolutionary fighters who had forced Díaz's resignation.

Madero was enormously popular among many sectors but did not immediately assume the presidency. An interim president was installed, and elections were scheduled. Madero was elected in a landslide and sworn into office on 6 November 1911. The Madero administration soon encountered opposition from conservatives and more radical revolutionaries. Hesitation to implement large-scale land reform efforts upset many of his followers, who viewed it as a promised demand from conflict participation. Workers also became disillusioned by his moderate policies. Former supporter Emiliano Zapata declared himself in rebellion against Madero in the Plan of Ayala, and in the north, Pascual Orozco led an insurrection against him. Foreign investors became concerned that Madero could not maintain political stability, while foreign governments were concerned that a destabilized Mexico would threaten international order.

In February 1913, a coup d'état backed by the United States and led by conservative generals Félix Díaz (a nephew of Porfirio Díaz), Bernardo Reyes, and Victoriano Huerta was staged in Mexico City, with the latter taking the presidency. Madero was captured and assassinated along with vice president José María Pino Suárez in a series of events now called the Ten Tragic Days, during which his brother Gustavo was tortured and killed. After his assassination, Madero became a unifying force among revolutionary factions against the Huerta regime. In the north, Venustiano Carranza, then governor of Coahuila, led the nascent Constitutionalist Army; meanwhile, Zapata continued his rebellion against the federal government under the Plan of Ayala. Once Huerta was ousted in July 1914, the revolutionary coalitions met in the Convention of Aguascalientes, where disagreements persisted, and Mexico entered a new stage of civil war.

== Early years (1873–1903) ==
=== Family background ===
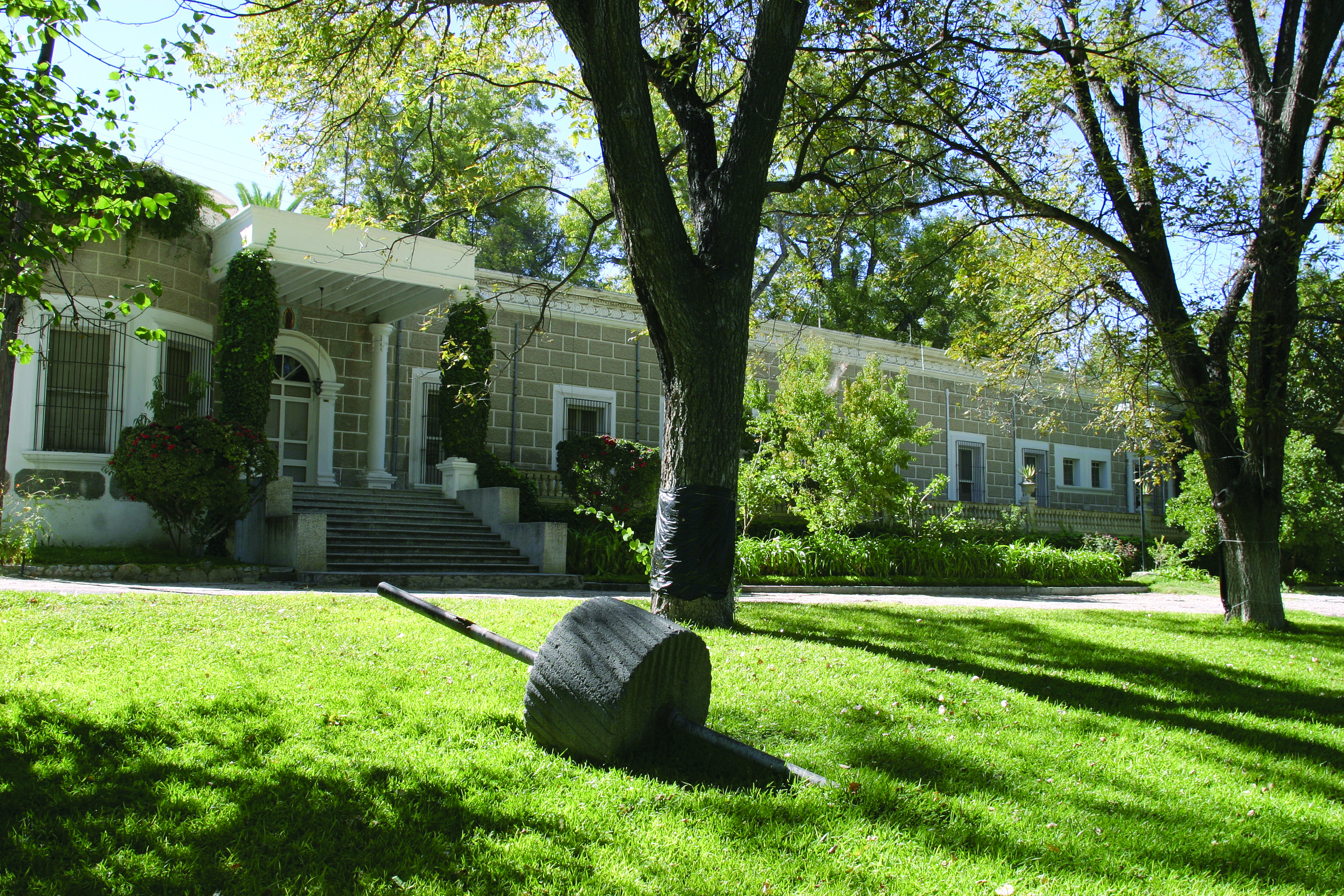
Hacienda del Rosario in Parras, birthplace of President Madero

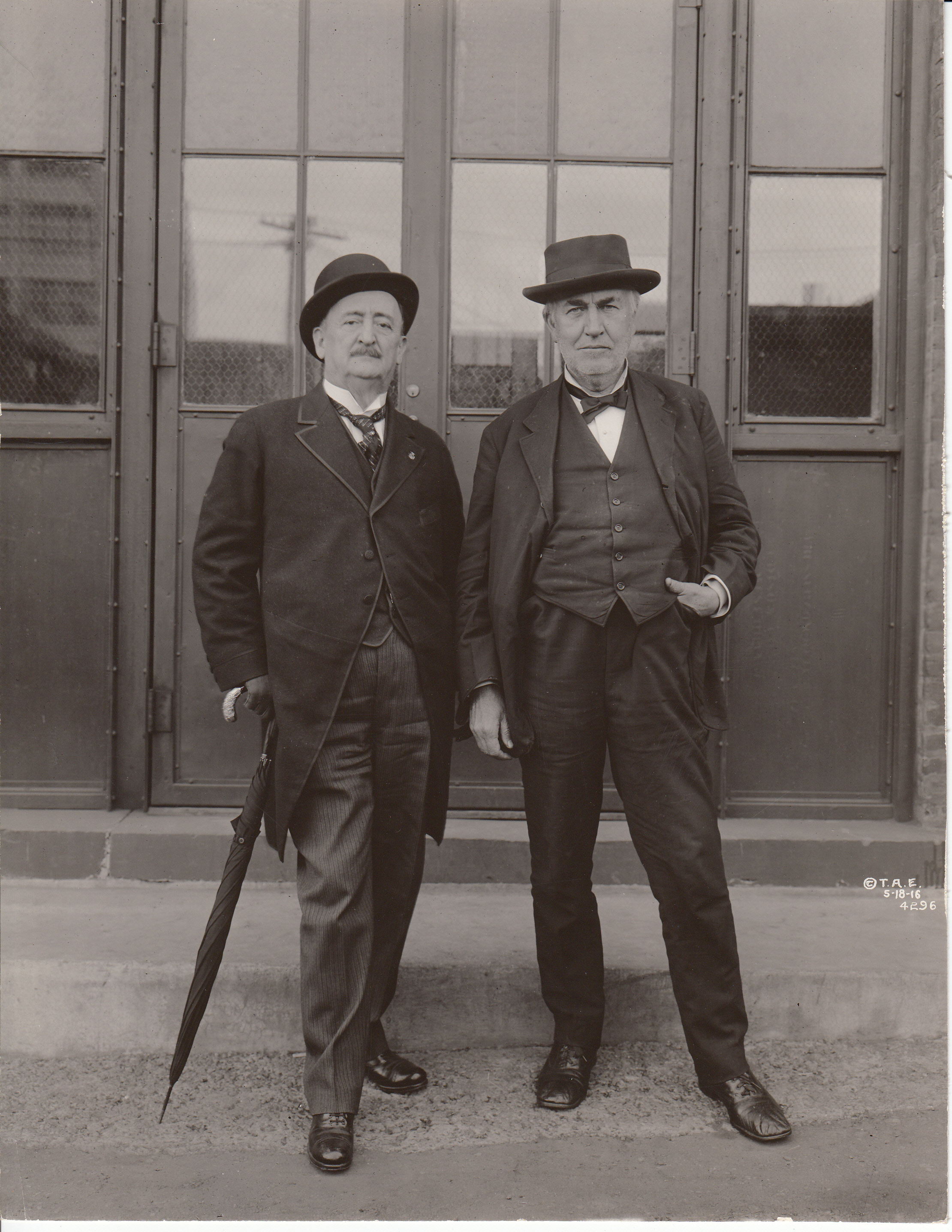
Francisco Madero Hernández and Thomas Edison

Francisco Ignacio Madero González was born in 1873 into a large and wealthy family in northeastern Mexico at the hacienda of El Rosario, in Parras de la Fuente, Coahuila. His grandfather Evaristo Madero Elizondo had built an enormous and diversified fortune as a young man and briefly served as Governor of Coahuila, from 1880 to 1884, during the four-year interregnum of Porfirio Díaz's rule (1880–1884), when Díaz's right-hand man General Manuel González served as president, doing a poor job in Díaz's opinion. Díaz returned to the presidency in 1884 and did not relinquish the office until 1911, when Francisco Madero's revolutionary movement forced him to resign. Díaz had permanently sidelined Evaristo Madero from further political office. He was of Portuguese-Jewish descent.

Evaristo was the founder of a commercial transport business. Taking advantage of economic opportunity, he transported cotton from the Confederate states to Mexican ports during the U.S. Civil War (1861–65).

Evaristo married twice, with the first marriage, before he made his fortune, to sixteen-year-old María Rafaela Hernández Lombaraña (1847–1870), the daughter of an influential landowner, together producing seven children. She was the half-sister of the powerful miner and banker Antonio V. Hernández Benavides, a close friend of José Yves Limantour, Secretary of Finance. Alongside his brother-in-law and others of his new political family's relations, Evaristo founded the Compañía Industrial de Parras, initially involved in commercial vineyards, cotton, and textiles, and later also in mining, cotton mills, ranching, banking, coal, guayule rubber, and foundries in the later part of the nineteenth century. After Rafaela Hernández's death at age 38, Evaristo married Manuela Farías y Benavides (1870–1893); the couple had eleven children. Benavides was a member of one of northern Mexico's most influential families, daughter of Juan Francisco Farías, founder of the Rio Grande Republic. The surviving children of Evaristo's marriages also married into prominent families and expanded the Madero family's power and wealth.

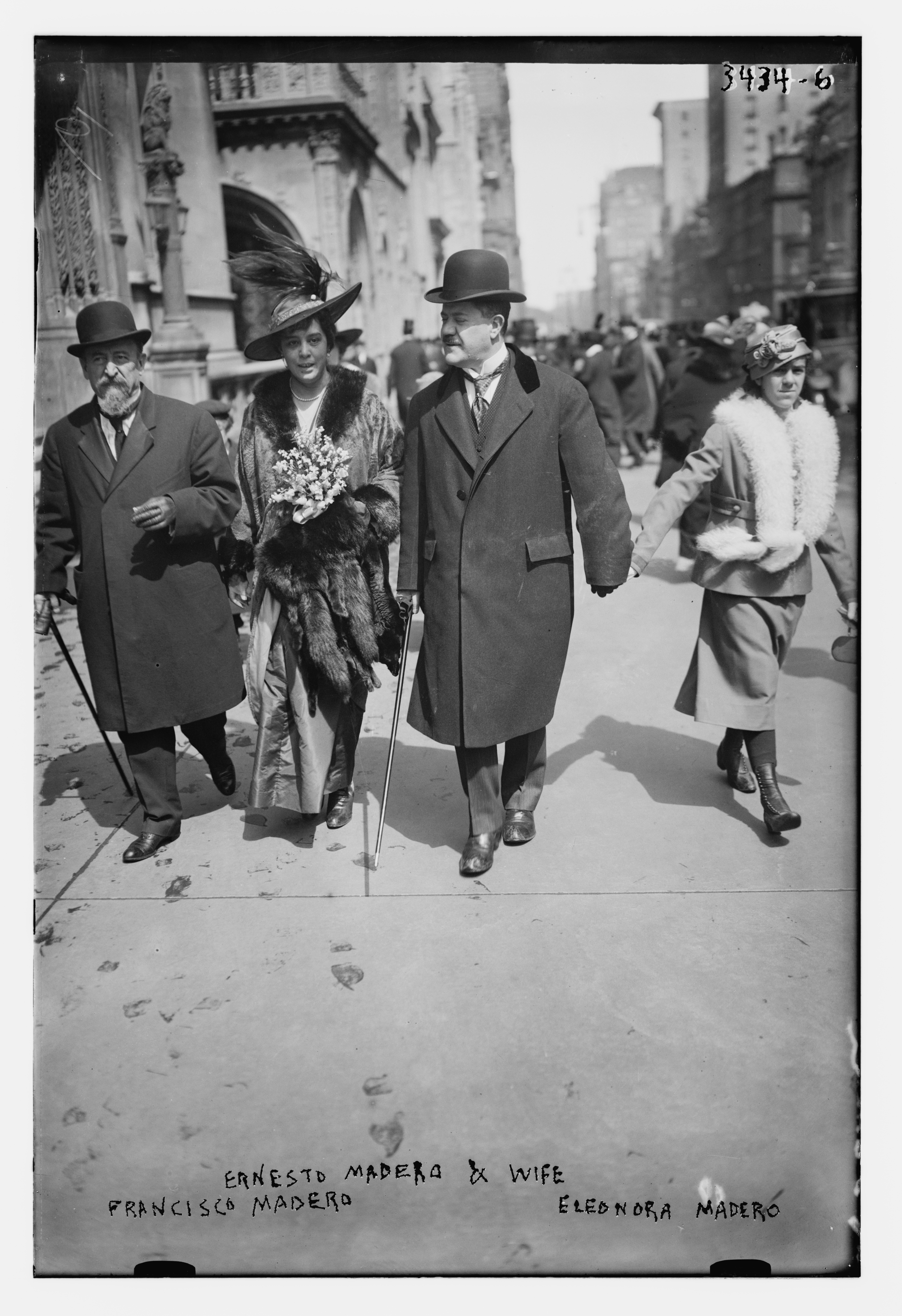
Francisco Madero Hernández with half-brother Ernesto Madero Farías, Secretary of Finance, Leonor Olivares Tapia (Mrs. Ernesto Madero), and niece Leonor Madero Olivares.

For many years despite their exclusion from political office, the family prospered during Porfirio Díaz's regime. By 1910 the family was one of the richest in Mexico, worth 30 million pesos ($15 million U.S. dollars of the day, and almost $500 million U.S. dollars in today's money). Much of this wealth arose from the diversification of Madero lands during the 1890s into the production of guayule rubber plants.

Unusually for a Mexican landowner, many of whom stayed close to home, the patriarch Evaristo traveled to Europe, as did Francisco's father. Francisco's father was interested in the increasingly popular philosophical movement of spiritism, founded by Allan Kardec, and subscribed to the La Revue Spirite and the Société Parisienne d'Études Spirites, whilst completing his studies at the École Commercial in Antwerp (Belgium). Back in Mexico, he hired Thomas Edison to electrify his hacienda and neighboring town of Parras. Young Francisco was sent to Paris to study business alongside his brother Gustavo and became a devotee of spiritism himself. He wrote extensively about spiritism in his diaries. "He was searching for ethical connections between Spiritualism and the Christian Gospels. 'I have no doubts that the moral transformation I have experienced is due to my becoming a medium.'"

Francisco I. Madero was the first-born son of Evaristo's first-born son of his first marriage, Francisco Ignacio Madero Hernández and Mercedes González Treviño, and was Evaristo's first-born grandson. Young Francisco was the first of his father's eleven children. This wealthy and prolific extended family could provide vast resources to young Francisco when he challenged Porfirio Díaz for the presidency in 1910. He was a sickly child and was small in stature as an adult. It is widely believed that Madero's middle initial, I, stood for Indalecio, but according to his birth certificate it stood for Ignacio. On the birth certificate, Ignacio was written with the archaic spelling of Ygnacio.

After winning election to the presidency in 1911, Francisco confirmed his uncle Ernesto Madero Farías, from his grandfather's second marriage, as his Minister of Finance (a post which he had since the previous presidency), which was used to accuse him of nepotism. Francisco was close to his brother Gustavo A. Madero as a trusted advisor when president. His brother Gustavo was murdered during the coup that overthrew Francisco from the presidency. His brothers Emilio, Julio, and Raúl fought in the Mexican Revolution.

Although Francisco I. Madero's marriage to Sara Pérez was childless and there are no direct descendants of his line of the Maderos, the descendants of Evaristo Madero make up some of Mexico's most influential families today. Thus, young Francisco was a member of an extended and powerful northern Mexican clan with a focus on commercial rather than political interests.

=== Education ===
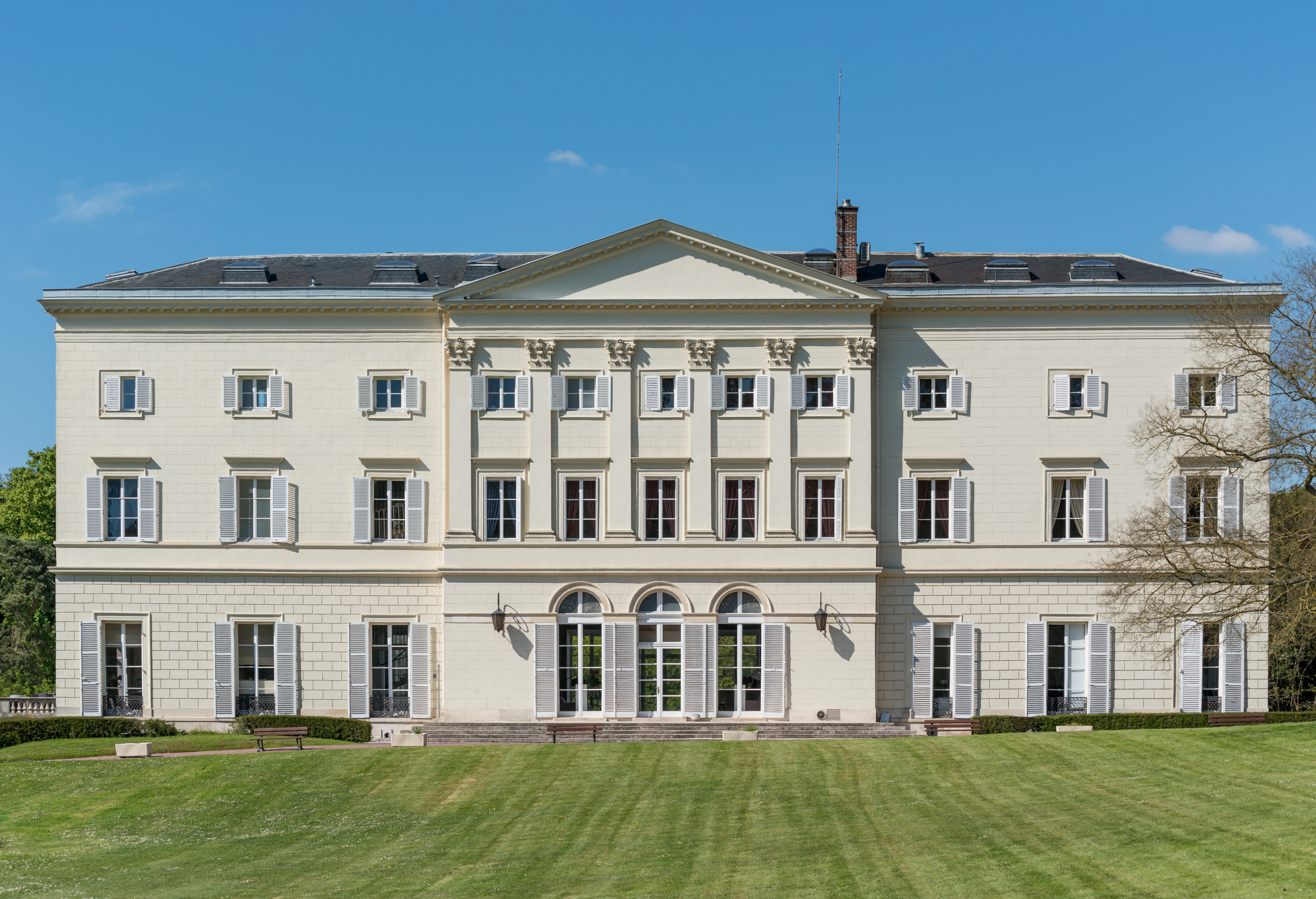
École des Hautes Études Commerciales de Paris, where Madero and his brother studied business.

Francisco and his younger brother Gustavo A. Madero attended the Jesuit college of San Juan in Saltillo and wanted to then become a Jesuit. He and his brother Gustavo briefly attended another religious school in the U.S. His English was poor, so he learned little in his short time there, and he abandoned any notion of a religious vocation. Between 1886 and 1892, Madero was educated in France and then the United States, attending the Lycée Hoche de Versailles, HEC Paris and UC Berkeley. At the Lycée Hoche in Versailles, France, he completed the classe préparatoire aux grandes écoles program. Soon after, he was admitted to study business at the prestigious École des Hautes Études Commerciales de Paris (HEC). His father's subscription to the magazine Revue Spirite awakened in the young Madero an interest in Spiritism, an offshoot of Spiritualism. During his time in Paris, Madero made a pilgrimage to the tomb of Allan Kardec, the founder of Spiritism, and became a passionate advocate of the belief, soon coming to believe he was a medium. Following business school, Madero studied at the University of California, Berkeley, to pursue courses in agricultural techniques and to improve his English. During his time there, he was influenced by the theosophist ideas of Annie Besant, which were prominent at nearby Stanford University.

=== Return to Mexico ===
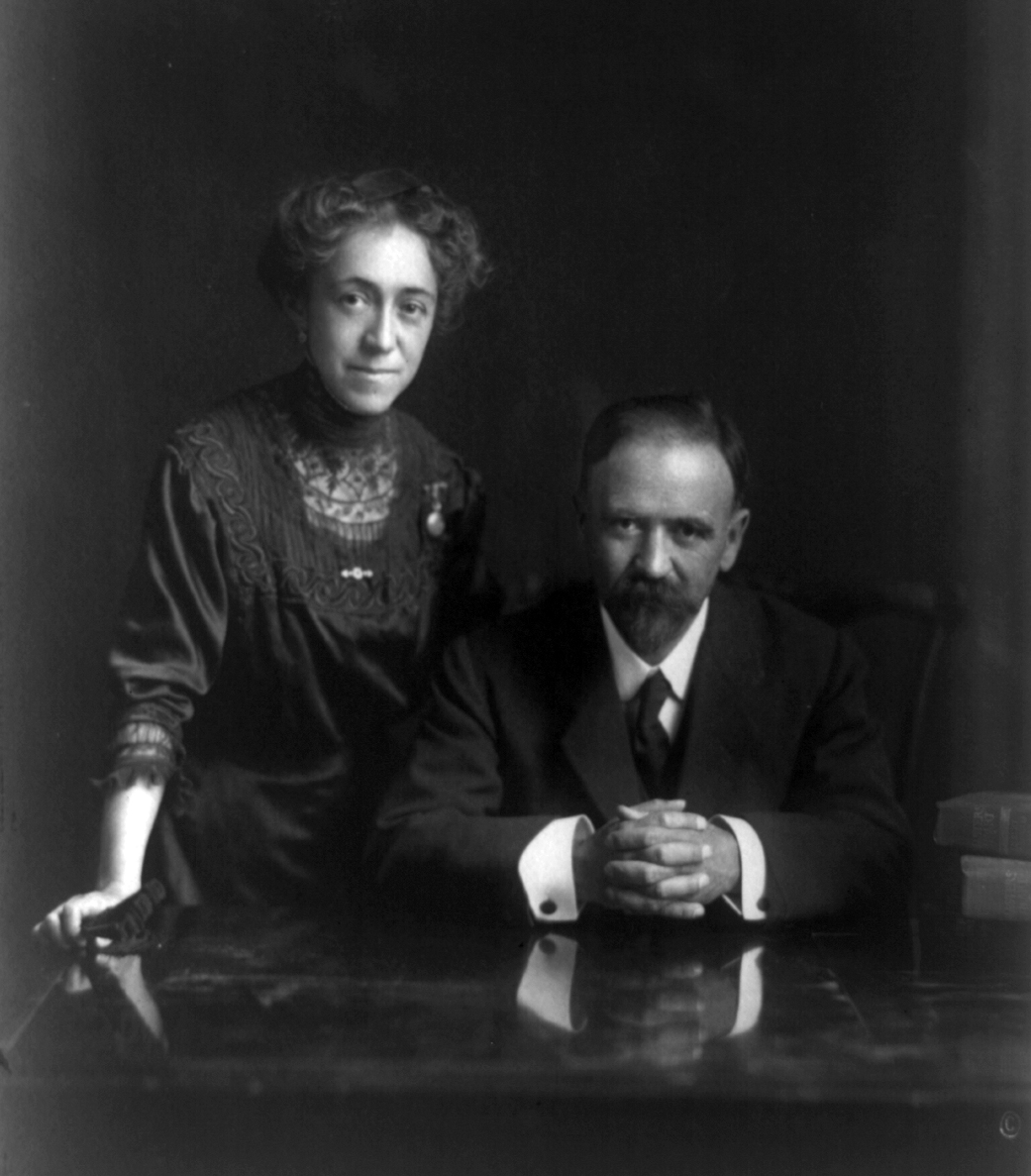
Francisco I. Madero with his wife, Sara Pérez Romero.

In 1893, the 20-year-old Madero returned to Mexico and assumed management of one of the Madero family's hacienda at San Pedro, Coahuila. Well-traveled and well-educated, he was now in robust health. Proving an enlightened and progressive member of the Madero commercial complex, Francisco installed new irrigation, introduced American-made cotton and cotton machinery, and built a soap factory and also an ice factory. He embarked on a lifelong commitment to philanthropy. His employees were well paid and received regular medical exams; he built schools, hospitals, and community kitchens; and he paid to support orphans and award scholarships. He also taught himself homeopathy and offered medical treatments to his employees. Francisco became increasingly engaged with Spiritism and in 1901 was convinced that the spirit of his brother Raúl, who had died at age 4, was communicating with him, urging him to do charity work and practice self-discipline and self-abnegation. Madero became a vegetarian and stopped drinking alcohol and smoking.

Already well-connected to a wealthy family and now well-educated in business, he had built a personal fortune of over 500,000 pesos by 1899. He invested in mines with other members of his family, which came to compete with interests of the Guggenheim family in Mexico. The family was organized on patriarchal principles, so that even though young Francisco was wealthy in his own right, his father and especially his grandfather Evaristo viewed him as someone who should be under the authority of his elders. As the eldest sibling, Francisco exercised authority over his younger brothers and sisters. In January 1903, he married Sara Pérez Romero, first in a civil ceremony, and then a Catholic nuptial mass celebrated by the archbishop.

== Political career ==
=== Introduction to politics (1903–1908) ===
On 2 April 1903, Bernardo Reyes, governor of Nuevo León, violently crushed a political demonstration, an example of the increasingly authoritarian policies of president Porfirio Díaz. Madero was deeply moved and, believing himself to be receiving advice from the spirit of his late brother Raúl, he decided to act. The spirit of Raúl told him, "Aspire to do good for your fellow citizens...working for a lofty ideal that will raise the moral level of society, that will succeed in liberating it from oppression, slavery, and fanaticism." Madero founded the Benito Juárez Democratic Club and ran for municipal office in 1904, though he lost the election narrowly. In addition to his political activities, Madero continued his interest in Spiritualism, publishing a number of articles under the pseudonym of Arjuna (a prince from the Mahabharata).

In 1905, Madero became increasingly involved in opposition to the Díaz government, which had excluded his family from political power. He organized political clubs and founded a political newspaper (El Demócrata) and a satirical periodical (El Mosco, "The Fly"). Madero's preferred candidate, Frumencio Fuentes, was defeated by that of Porfirio Díaz in Coahuila's 1905 gubernatorial elections. Díaz considered jailing Madero, but Bernardo Reyes suggested that Francisco's father be asked to control his increasingly political son.

=== Leader of the Anti-Re-election Movement (1908–1909) ===
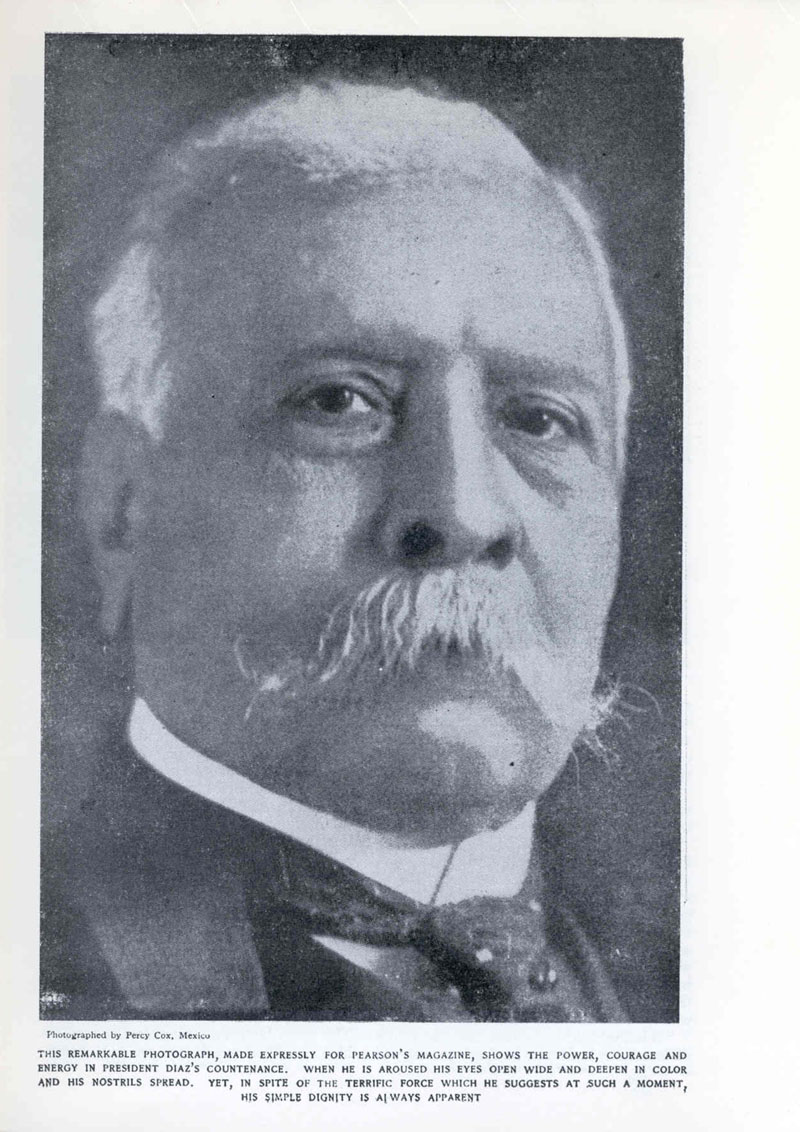
Photo of Porfirio Díaz (1830–1915) that accompanied the Creelman interview in Pearson's Magazine (1908).

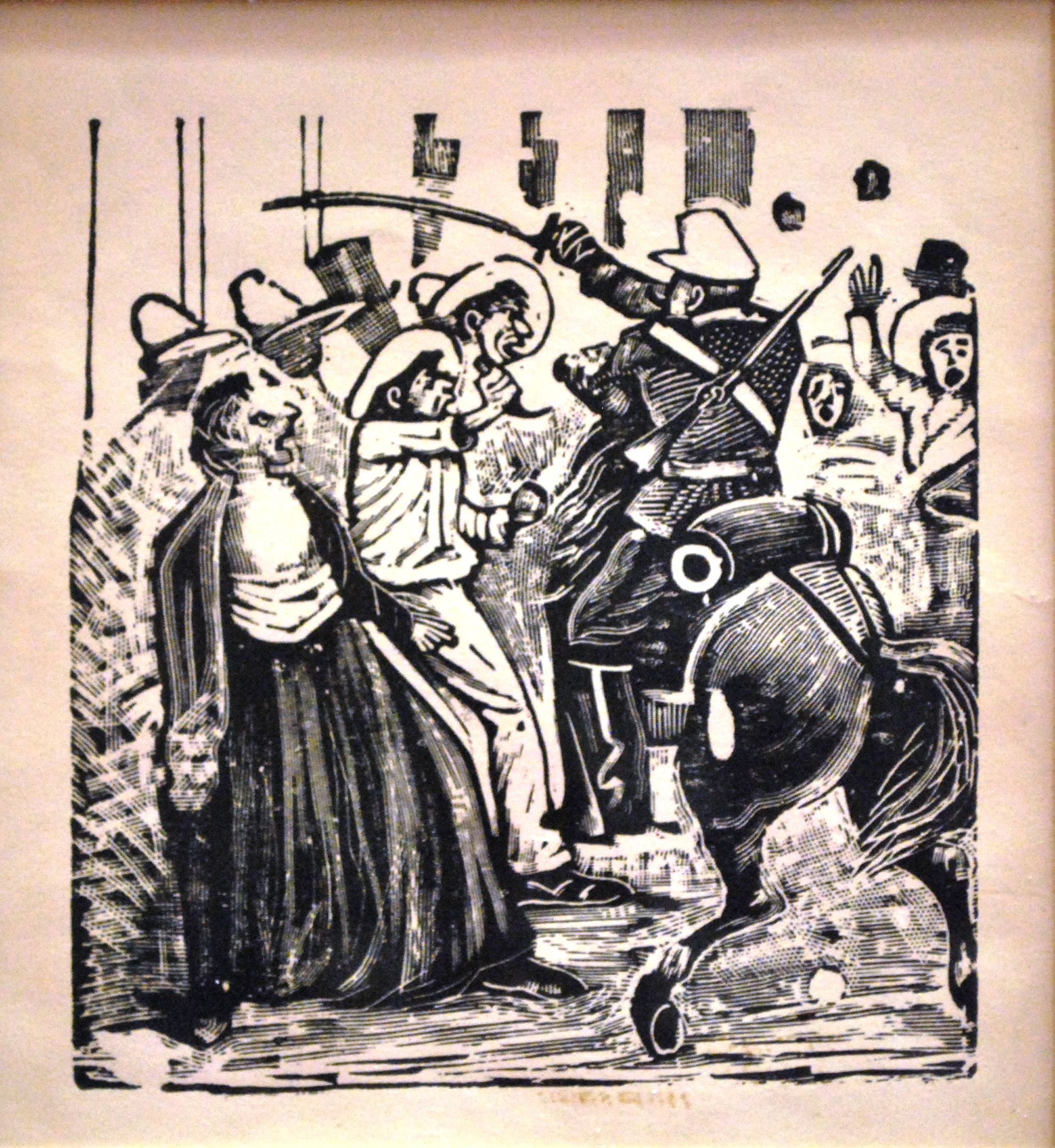
"Manifestación antireeleccionista" by José Guadalupe Posada.

In an interview with journalist James Creelman published on 17 February 1908 issue of Pearson's Magazine, President Díaz said that Mexico was ready for a democracy and that the 1910 presidential election would be a free election.

Madero spent the bulk of 1908 writing a book, which he believed was at the direction of spirits, now including that of Benito Juárez himself. This book, published in January 1909, was titled La sucesión presidencial en 1910 (The Presidential Succession of 1910). The book quickly became a bestseller in Mexico. The book proclaimed that the concentration of absolute power in the hands of one man – Porfirio Díaz – for so long had made Mexico sick. Madero pointed out the irony that in 1871, Porfirio Díaz's political slogan had been "No Re-election". Madero acknowledged that Porfirio Díaz had brought peace and a measure of economic growth to Mexico. However, Madero argued that this was counterbalanced by the dramatic loss of freedom, including the brutal treatment of the Yaqui people, the repression of workers in Cananea, excessive concessions to the United States, and an unhealthy centralization of politics around the person of the president. Madero called for a return of the Liberal 1857 Constitution. To achieve this, Madero proposed organizing a Democratic Party under the slogan Sufragio efectivo, no reelección ("Effective Suffrage. No Re-election"). Porfirio Díaz could either run in a free election or retire.

Madero's book was well received, and widely read. Many people began to call Madero the Apostle of Democracy. Madero sold off much of his property – often at a considerable loss – to finance anti-re-election activities throughout Mexico. He founded the Anti-Re-election Center in Mexico City in May 1909, and soon thereafter lent his backing to the periodical El Antirreeleccionista, which was run by the young lawyer/philosopher José Vasconcelos and another intellectual, Luis Cabrera Lobato. In Puebla, Aquiles Serdán, from a politically engaged family, contacted Madero and as a result, formed an Anti-Re-electionist Club to organize for the 1910 elections, particularly among the working classes. Madero traveled throughout Mexico giving anti-reelectionist speeches, and everywhere he went he was greeted by crowds of thousands. His candidacy cost him financially, since he sold much of his property at a loss to back his campaign.

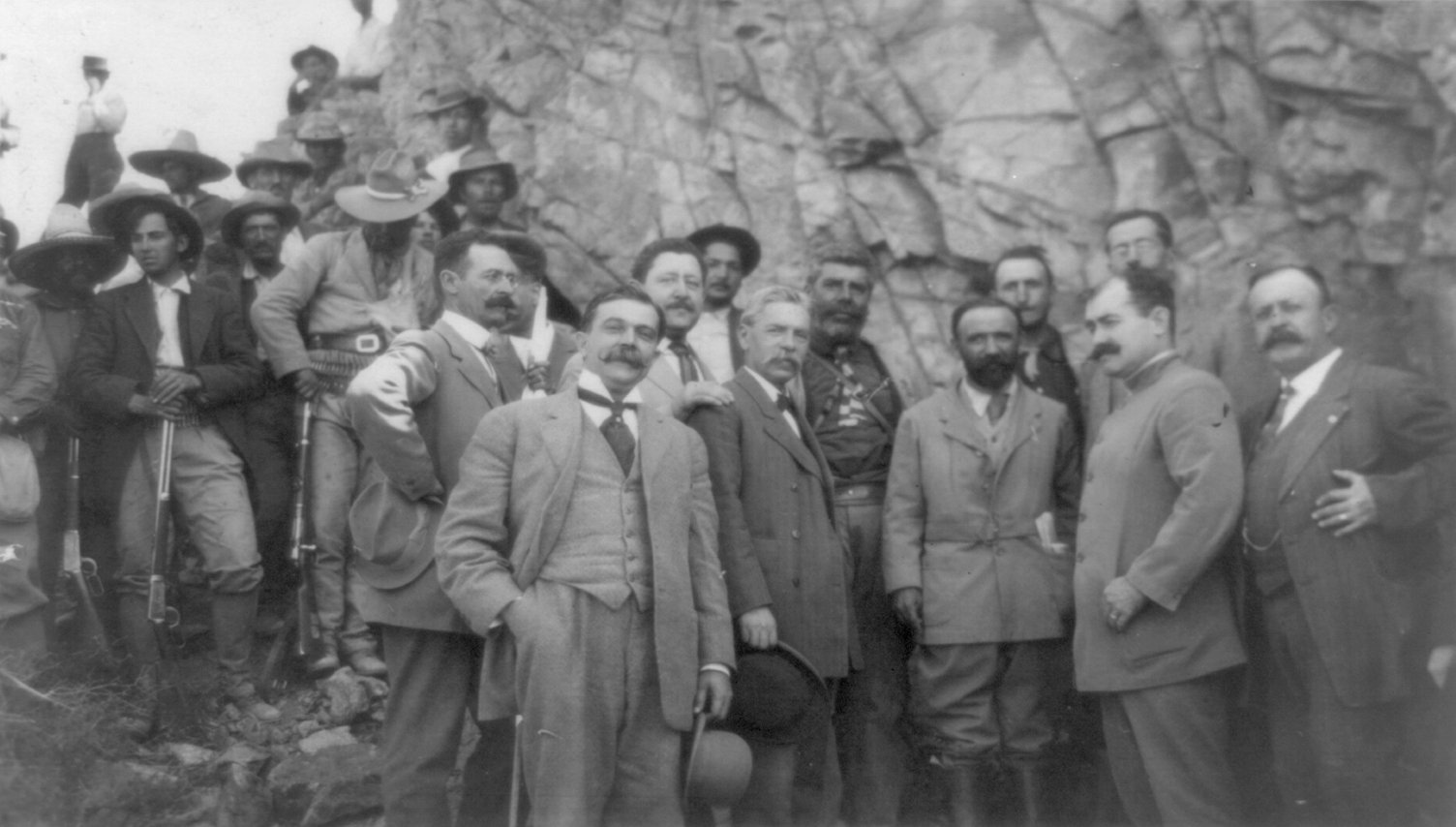
Francisco I Madero and leaders.

In spite of the attacks by Madero and his earlier statements to the contrary, Díaz ran for re-election. In a show of U.S. support, Díaz and William Howard Taft planned a summit in El Paso, Texas, and Ciudad Juárez, Chihuahua, for 16 October 1909, a historic first meeting between a Mexican and a U.S. president and also the first time a U.S. president would cross the border into Mexico. At the meeting, Diaz told John Hays Hammond, "Since I am responsible for bringing several billion dollars in foreign investments into my country, I think I should continue in my position until a competent successor is found."

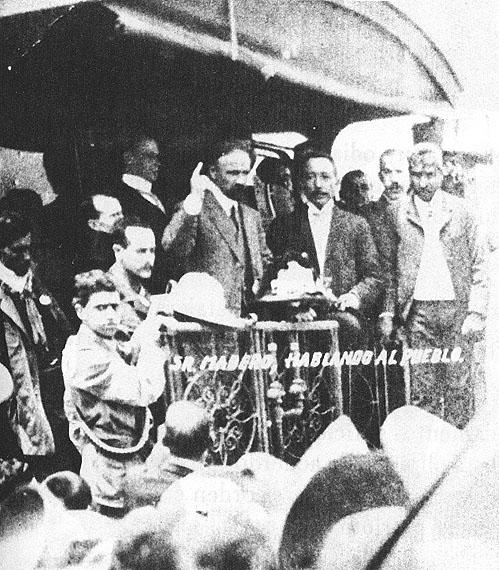
Francisco I. Madero campaigns from the back of a railway car in 1910.

The summit was a great success for Díaz, but it could have been a major tragedy. On the day of the summit, Frederick Russell Burnham, the celebrated scout, and Private C.R. Moore, a Texas Ranger, discovered a man holding a concealed palm pistol along the procession route and they disarmed the assassin within only a few feet of Díaz and Taft.

The Porfirian regime reacted to Madero by placing pressure on the Madero family's banking interests, and at one point even issued a warrant for Madero's arrest on the grounds of "unlawful transaction in rubber". Madero was not arrested, though, apparently due in part to the intervention of Díaz's finance minister, José Yves Limantour, a friend of the Madero family. In April 1910, the Anti-Re-electionist Party met and selected Madero as their nominee for President of Mexico.

During the convention, the governor of Veracruz, Teodoro Dehesa, arranged a meeting between Madero and Díaz, that took place in Díaz's residence on 16 April 1910. Only the candidate and the president were present for the meeting, so the only account of it is Madero's correspondence. A political solution and compromise might have been possible, with Madero withdrawing his candidacy. It became clear to Madero that Díaz was a decrepit old man, out of touch politically, and unaware of the extent of formal political opposition. The meeting was important for strengthening Madero's resolve that political compromise was not possible and he is quoted as saying "Porfirio is not an imposing chief. Nevertheless, it will be necessary to start a revolution to overthrow him. But who will crush it afterwards?" Madero was worried that Porfirio Díaz would not willingly relinquish office, warned his supporters of the possibility of electoral fraud and proclaimed that "Force shall be met by force!"

=== Campaign, arrest, escape 1910 ===
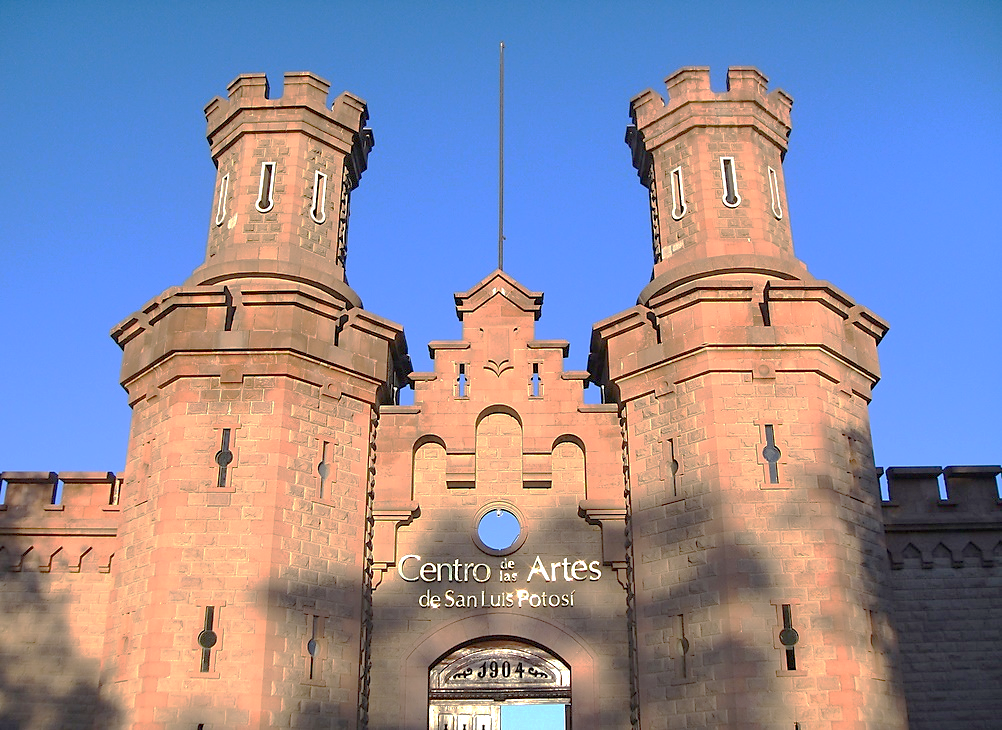
Madero's prison in San Luis Potosí, currently an art museum

Madero campaigned across the country on a message of reform and met with numerous supporters. Resentful of the "peaceful invasion" from the United States "which came to control 90 percent of Mexico's mineral resources, its national railroad, its oil industry and, increasingly, its land," Mexico's poor and middle-class overwhelmingly showed their support for Madero. Fearful of a dramatic change in direction, on 6 June 1910, the Porfirian regime arrested Madero in Monterrey and sent him to a prison in San Luis Potosí. Approximately 5,000 other members of the Anti-Re-electionist movement were also jailed. Francisco Vázquez Gómez took over the nomination, but during Madero's time in jail, a fraudulent election was held on 21 June 1910 that gave Díaz an unbelievably large margin of victory.

Madero's father used his influence with the state governor and posted bond to give Madero the right to move about the city on horseback during the day. On 4 October 1910, Madero galloped away from his guards and took refuge with sympathizers in a nearby village. Three days later he was smuggled across the U.S. border, hidden in a baggage car by sympathetic railway workers. He took up residence in San Antonio, Texas, where he plotted his next moves. He wrote the Plan of San Luis Potosí in San Antonio, but back dated and situated it to the last place he had been in Mexico.

=== Plan of San Luis Potosí and rebellion ===
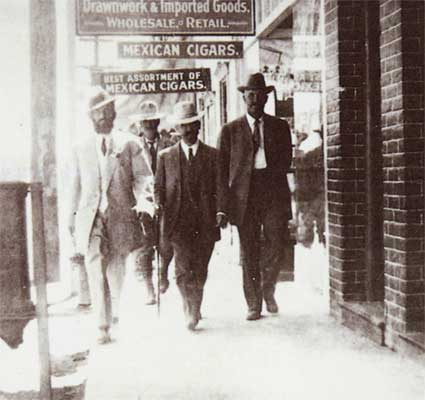
Madero (center) in San Antonio, Texas while in exile

Madero set up shop in San Antonio, Texas, and quickly issued his Plan of San Luis Potosí, which had been written during his time in prison, partly with the help of Ramón López Velarde. The plan proclaimed the elections of 1910 null and void, and called for an armed revolution to begin at 6 pm on 20 November 1910, against the "illegitimate presidency/dictatorship of Díaz". At that point, Madero declared himself provisional President of Mexico, and called for a general refusal to acknowledge the central government, restitution of land to villages and Indian communities, and freedom for political prisoners. Madero's policies painted him as a leader of each of the different sectors of Mexican society at the time. He was a member of the upper class; the middle class saw that he sought to gain entry into political processes; the lower class saw that he promised fairer politics and a much more substantial, equitable economic system.

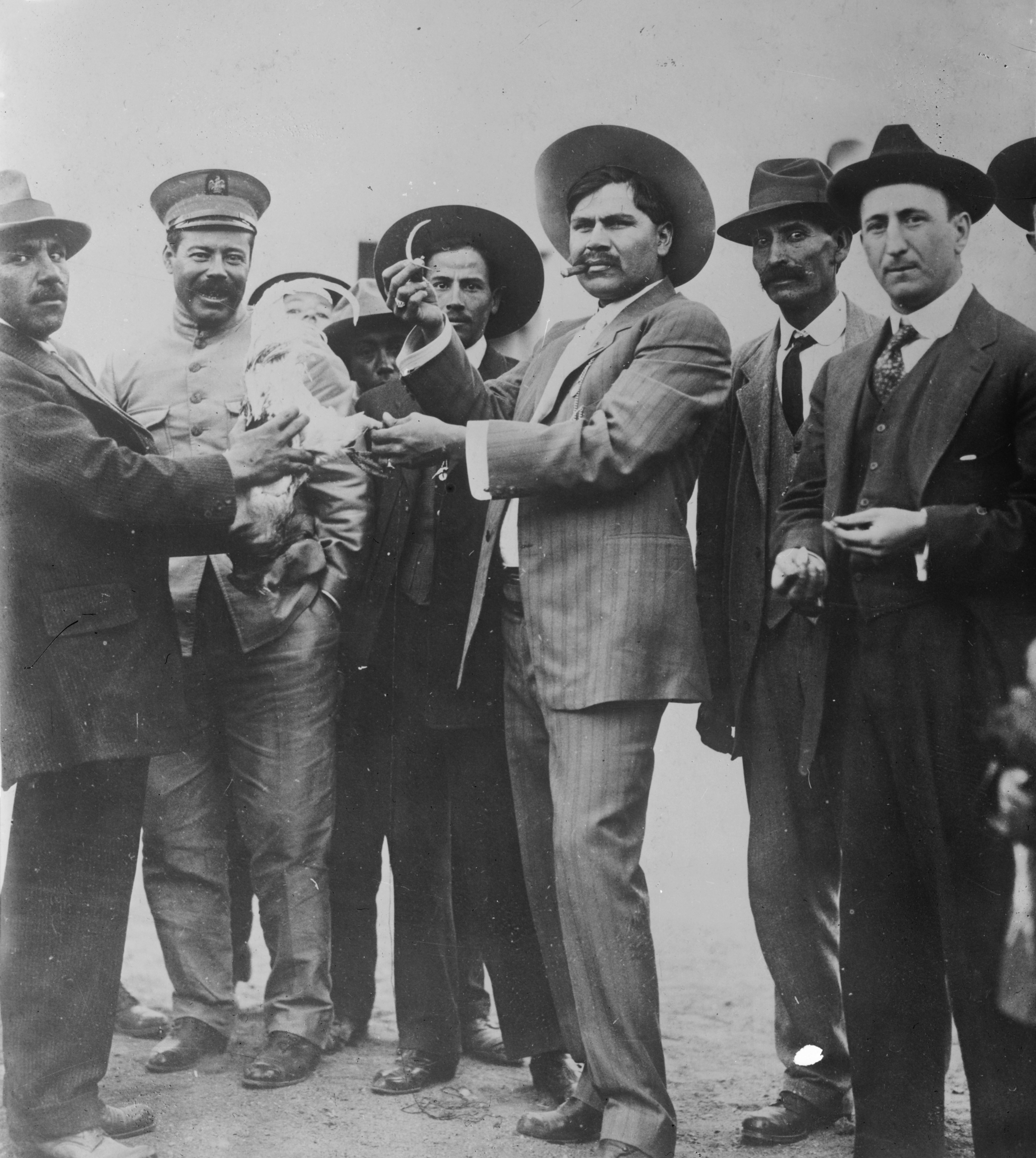
Pancho Villa and Raúl Madero

The family drew on its financial resources to make regime change possible, with Madero's brother Gustavo A. Madero hiring the law firm of Washington lawyer Sherburne Hopkins, the "world's best rigger of Latin American revolutions" to foment support in the U.S. A strategy to discredit Díaz with U.S. business and the U.S. government did meet some success, with Standard Oil engaging in talks with Gustavo Madero, but more importantly, the U.S. government "bent neutrality laws for the revolutionaries." The U.S. Senate held hearings in 1913 as to whether the U.S. had any role in fomenting revolution in Mexico, Hopkins gave testimony that "he did not believe that it cost the Maderos themselves more than $400,000 gold", with the aggregate cost being $1,500,000US.

Madero supposedly initiated the Mexican Revolution with guidance from spirits (Madero identified as a medium who communicated with ghosts, including historical figures like Benito Juarez and even his deceased younger brother.)

El Paso, Texas, became a major staging point for Madero's insurrection against Díaz. It is directly across the Rio Grande from Ciudad Juárez, where two Mexican railway lines, the Mexican National Railroad and the Mexican Northwest Railroad, are connected with the U.S. Southern Pacific Railroad. El Paso was the site of a historic meeting between Mexican President Porfirio Díaz and U.S. President William Howard Taft in 1909. The population of the twin border cities increased dramatically in the late nineteenth and early twentieth centuries with legal commerce and considerable smuggling, "a time-honored occupation along the border." As the political tensions in Mexico increased, the smuggling of guns and ammunition to insurrectionists was big business. Madero remained in San Antonio, Texas, but his main man in Chihuahua, Abraham González, had recruited gifted natural military leaders, Pancho Villa and Pascual Orozco, to Madero's cause. Chihuahua became the hub of insurrectionist activity. Villa and Orozco had increasing success against the Federal Army, which drew more recruits to Madero's cause since it seemed to have a real chance at success. Antonio I. Villareal, a follower of Ricardo Flores Magón, who forbade members of the Magonista movement to have anything to do with the Madero movement, but the pragmatist Villareal joined Madero.

On 20 November 1910, Madero arrived at the border and planned to meet up with 400 men raised by his uncle Catarino Benavides Hernández to launch an attack on Ciudad Porfirio Díaz (modern-day Piedras Negras, Coahuila). However, his uncle arrived late and brought only ten men. Madero decided to postpone the revolution. Instead, he and his brother Raúl (who had been given the same name as his late brother) traveled incognito to New Orleans, Louisiana.

On 14 February 1911, Madero crossed the border into Chihuahua state from Texas, and on 6 March 1911 led 130 men in an attack on Casas Grandes, Chihuahua. Although holding democratic ideals that attracted many to his movement, Madero learned he was not a military leader. "Madero didn't know the first thing about warfare," initially capturing the town from the Federal Army, but he did not realize he needed to scout whether Federal reinforcements were on the way. There were heavy casualties among the insurrectionists, a number of whom were foreigners, including many from the U.S. and some from Germany. Two survivors of the Casas Grandes debacle were Giuseppe Garibaldi II, grandson of the famous Italian revolutionary, and General Benjamin Johannes Viljoen, an Afrikaner veteran of the Boer War. Madero was slightly wounded in his right arm in the fighting, shown bandaged in a photograph. Madero was saved by his personal bodyguard and Revolutionary general Máximo Castillo. He remained head of the movement in the north to oust Díaz. Madero movement successfully imported arms from the United States, procured by agents in the United States. Some were shipped directly from New York, disguised so that they would not be intercepted by the U.S. government. There were two businesses in El Paso that sold arms and ammunition to the rebels. The U.S. government of President William Howard Taft hired agents to surveil insurrectionists, fairly openly operated in El Paso. But the U.S. government efforts to halt the flow of arms to the Mexican revolutionaries failed.

By April the Revolution had spread to eighteen states, including Morelos where the leader was Emiliano Zapata. On 1 April 1911, Porfirio Díaz claimed that he had heard the voice of the people of Mexico, replaced his cabinet, and agreed to restitution of the lands of the dispossessed. Madero did not believe this statement and instead demanded the resignation of President Díaz and Vice-president Ramón Corral. Madero then attended a meeting with the other revolutionary leaders – they agreed to a fourteen-point plan which called for pay for revolutionary soldiers; the release of political prisoners; and the right of the revolutionaries to name several members of cabinet. Madero was moderate, however. He believed that the revolutionaries should proceed cautiously so as to minimize bloodshed and should strike a deal with Díaz if possible.

In early May, Madero wanted to extend a ceasefire, but his fellow revolutionaries Pascual Orozco and Pancho Villa disagreed and went ahead without orders on 8 May to attack Ciudad Juárez. It surrendered after two days of bloody fighting. The revolutionaries won this battle decisively, making it clear that Díaz could no longer retain power.

On 21 May 1911, the Treaty of Ciudad Juárez was signed. Under the terms of the Treaty of Ciudad Juárez, Díaz and Corral agreed to resign by the end of May 1911, with Díaz's Minister of Foreign Affairs, Francisco León de la Barra, becoming interim president solely for the purpose of calling general elections. Madero did not want to come to power by force of arms, but by a democratic election.

This first phase of the Mexican Revolution thus ended with Díaz leaving for exile in Europe at the end of May 1911. He was escorted to the port of Veracruz by General Victoriano Huerta. On 7 June 1911, Madero entered Mexico City in triumph where he was greeted with huge crowds shouting "¡Viva Madero!"

Madero was arriving not as the conquering hero, but as a presidential candidate who now embarked on campaigning for the fall presidential election. He left in place all but the top political figures of the Díaz regime as well as the Federal Army, which had just been defeated by revolutionary forces. The Governor of Coahuila, Venustiano Carranza, and Luis Cabrera had strongly advised Madero not to sign the treaty, since it gave away the power the revolutionary forces had won. For Madero, that was not the only consideration. Madero saw that revolutionaries like Orozco were not going to docilely obey his orders not to attack and the situation could get even more out of hand when Díaz resigned. Madero recognized the legitimacy of the Federal Army and called on revolutionary forces to disband. "Having removed Díaz, it appeared that Madero was trying to contain the Revolutionary tiger before it had time to enjoy its liberty."

=== Interim presidency of De la Barra (May–November 1911) ===
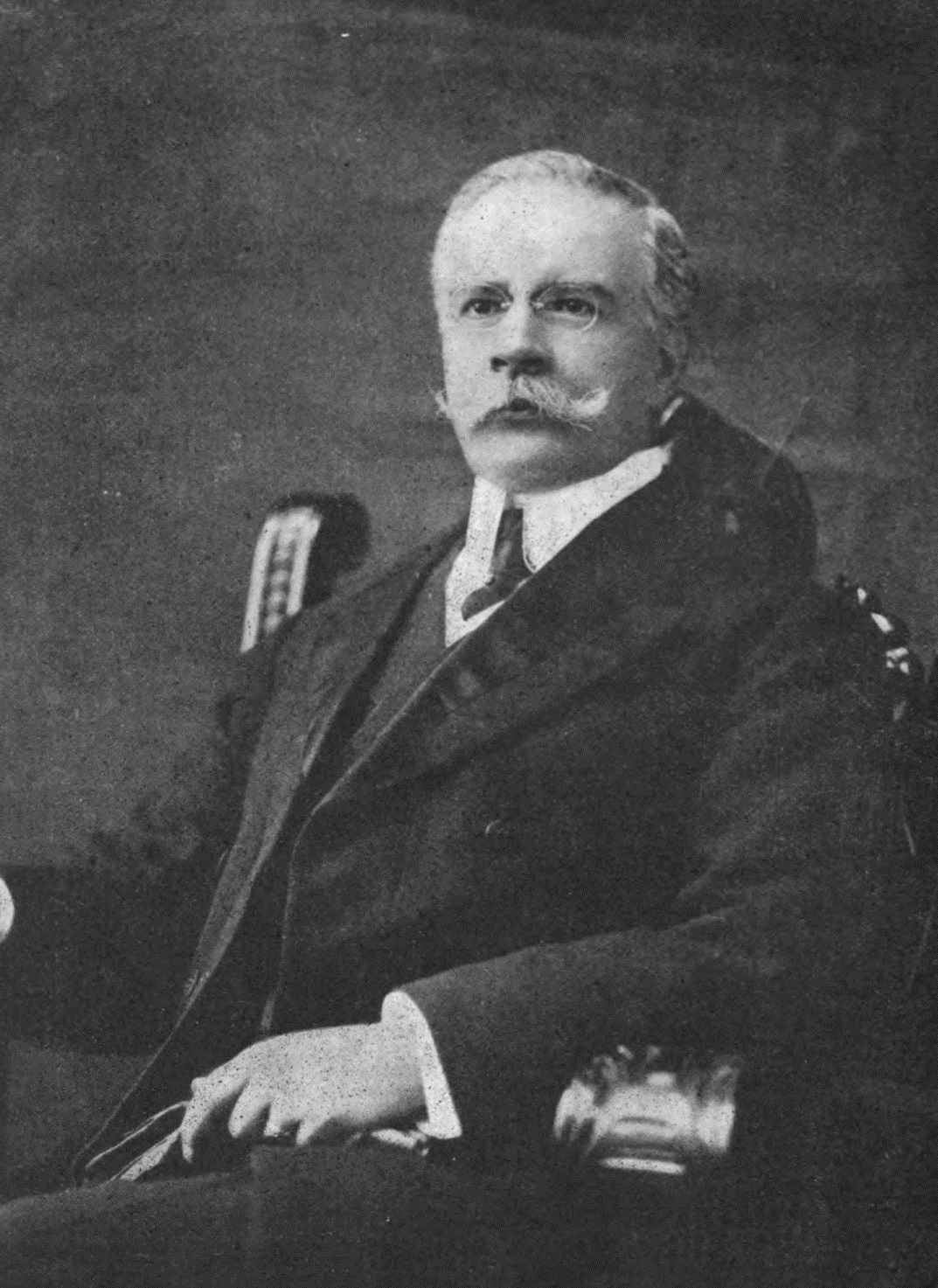
Francisco León de la Barra (1863–1939), whose interim presidency in 1911 gave Madero's enemies time to organize.

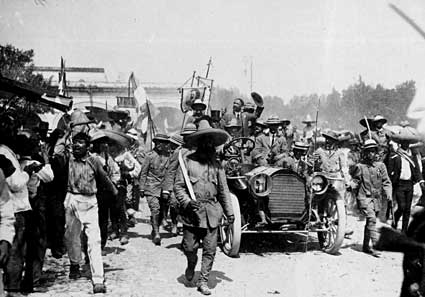
Francisco I. Madero campaigning in Cuernavaca, June 1911 and meeting Emiliano Zapata. Zapata rebelled in 1911, because of President Madero's slowness to implement land reform.

Although Madero and his supporters had forced Porfirio Díaz from power, he did not assume the presidency in June 1911. Instead, following the terms of the Treaty of Ciudad Juárez, he was a candidate for president and had no formal role in the interim presidency of Francisco León de la Barra, a diplomat and lawyer. Left in place was the Congress of Mexico, which was full of candidates whom Díaz had handpicked for the 1910 election. By doing this, Madero was true to his ideological commitment to constitutional democracy, but with members of the Díaz regime still in power, he was caused difficulties in the short and long term. The German ambassador to Mexico, Paul von Hintze, who associated with the Interim President, said of him that "De la Barra wants to accommodate himself with dignity to the inevitable advance of the ex-revolutionary influence, while accelerating the widespread collapse of the Madero party...." Madero sought to be a moderate democrat and follow the course outlined in treaty bringing about exile of Díaz, but by calling for the disarming and demobilization of his revolutionary base, he undermined his support. The Mexican Federal Army, just defeated by the revolutionaries, was to continue as the armed force of the Mexican state. Madero argued that the revolutionaries should henceforth proceed solely by peaceful means. In the south, revolutionary leader Emiliano Zapata was skeptical about disbanding his troops, especially since the Federal Army from the Díaz era remained essentially intact. However, Madero traveled south to meet with Zapata at Cuernavaca and Cuautla, Morelos. Madero assured Zapata that the land redistribution promised in the Plan of San Luis Potosí would be carried out when Madero became president.

With Madero now campaigning for the presidency, which he was expected to win, several landowners from Zapata's state of Morelos took advantage of his not being head of state and appealed to President De la Barra and the Congress to restore their lands which had been seized by Zapatista revolutionaries. They spread exaggerated stories of atrocities committed by Zapata's irregulars, calling Zapata the "Attila of the South". De la Barra and the Congress, therefore, decided to send regular troops under Victoriano Huerta to suppress Zapata's revolutionaries. Madero once again traveled south to urge Zapata to disband his supporters peacefully, but Zapata refused on the grounds that Huerta's troops were advancing on Yautepec. Zapata's suspicions proved accurate as Huerta's Federal soldiers moved violently into Yautepec. Madero wrote to De la Barra, saying that Huerta's actions were unjustified and recommending that Zapata's demands be met. However, when he left the south, he had achieved nothing. Nevertheless, he promised the Zapatistas that once he became president, things would change. Most Zapatistas had grown suspicious of Madero, however.

== Presidency and assassination (November 1911 – February 1913) ==
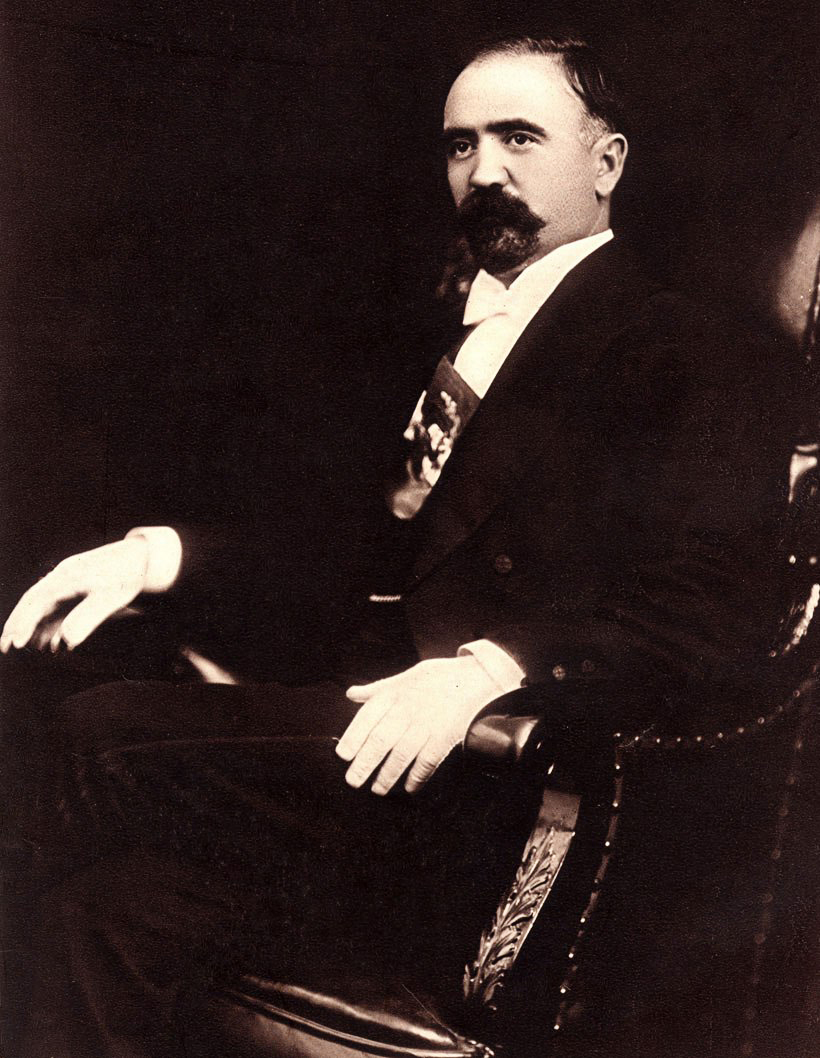
Francisco I. Madero, President of Mexico.

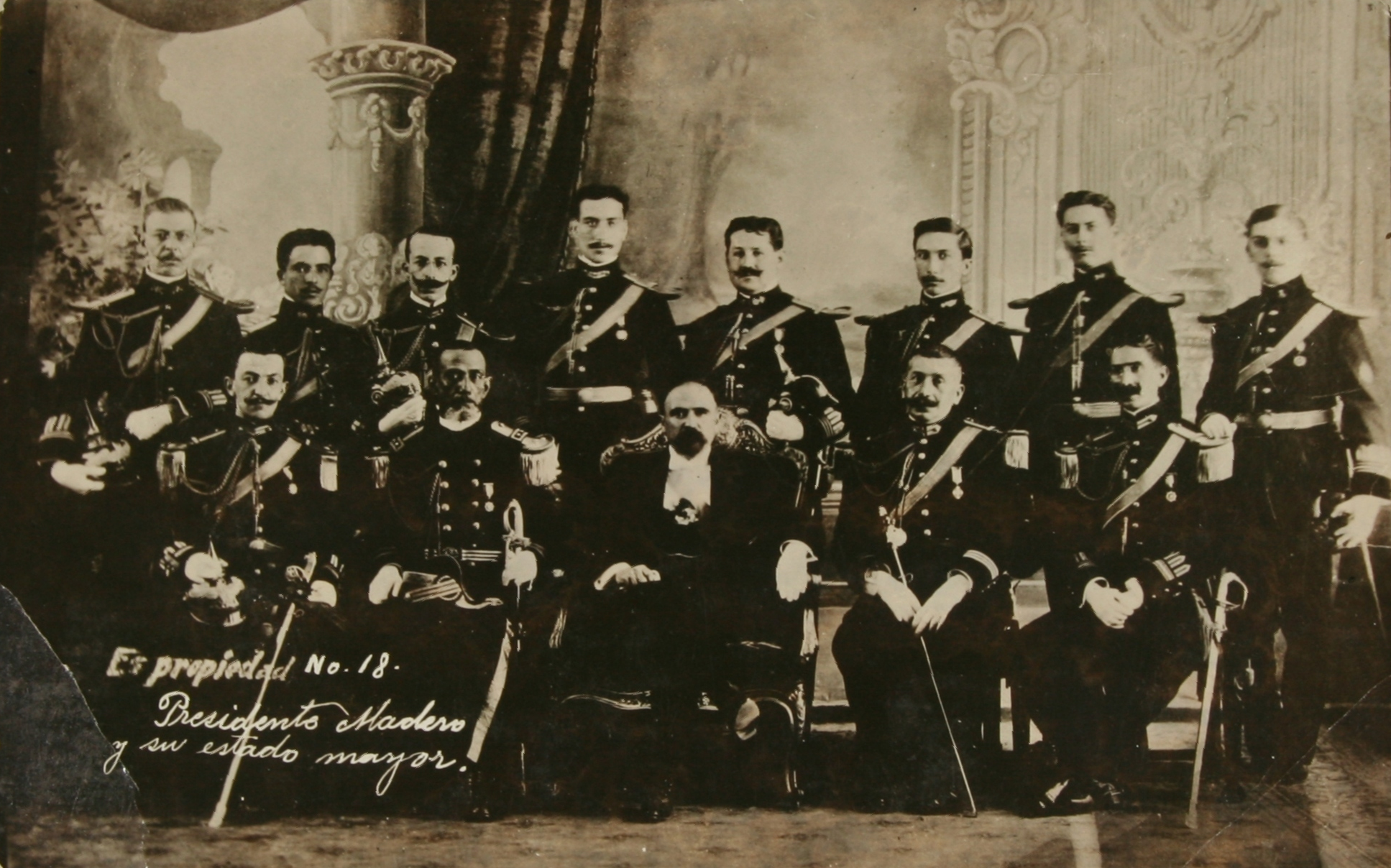
Madero and his staff, 1911.

Madero became president in November 1911, and, intending to reconcile the nation, appointed a cabinet that included many of Porfirio Díaz's supporters, as well as Madero's uncle Ernesto Madero, as Minister of Finance. A curious fact is that almost immediately after taking office in November, Madero became the first head of state in the world to fly in an airplane, which the Mexican press was later to mock. Madero was unable to achieve the reconciliation he desired since conservative Porfirians had organized themselves during the interim presidency and now mounted a sustained and effective opposition to Madero's reform program. Conservatives in the Senate refused to pass the reforms he advocated. At the same time, several of Madero's allies denounced him for being overly conciliatory with the Porfirians and with not moving aggressively forward with reforms.

After years of censorship, Mexican newspapers took advantage of their newly found freedom of the press to harshly criticize Madero's performance as president. Gustavo A. Madero, the president's brother, remarked that "the newspapers bite the hand that took off their muzzle." President Madero refused the recommendation of some of his advisors that he bring back censorship. The press was particularly critical of Madero's handling of rebellions that broke out against his rule shortly after he became president.

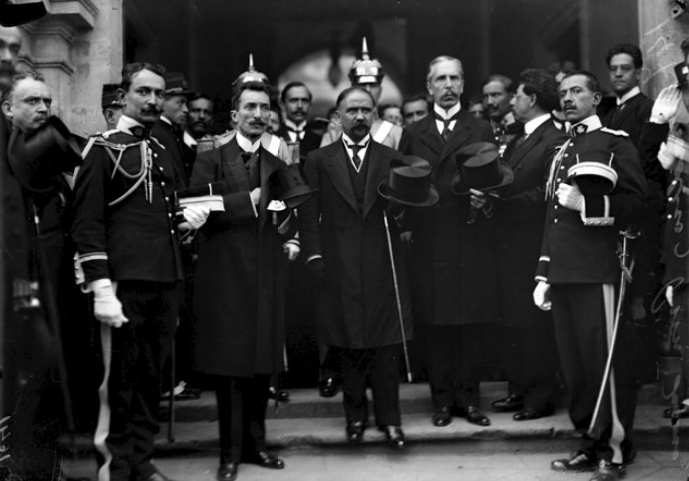
Madero and his vice president Pino Suárez (to his right, one step below) at the funeral of Justo Sierra, 1912

Despite internal and external opposition, the Madero administration had a number of important accomplishments, including freedom of the press. He freed political prisoners and abolished the death penalty. He did away with the practice of the Díaz government, which appointed local political bosses (jefes políticos), and instead set up a system of independent municipal authorities. State elections were free and fair. He was concerned about the improvement of education, establishing new schools and workshops. An important step was the creation of a federal department of labor, limited the workday to 10 hours, and set in place regulations on women's and children's labor. Unions were granted the right to freely organize. The Casa del Obrero Mundial ("House of the World Worker"), an organization with anarcho-syndicalist was founded during his presidency.

Madero alienated a number of his political supporters when he created a new political party, the Constitutionalist Progressive party, which replaced the Anti-Reelectionist Party. He ousted leftist Emilio Vázquez Gómez from his cabinet, brother of Francisco Vázquez Gómez, whom Madero had replaced as his vice presidential candidate with Pino Suárez.

Madero made gestures of reform to those who had helped bring him to power, but his aim was a democratic transition to power, fulfilled by his election. His supporters were offered mild gestures of reform, creating a Department of Labor and a National Agrarian Commission, but organized labor and peasants seeking land did not have their fundamental situations changed.

=== Rebellions ===
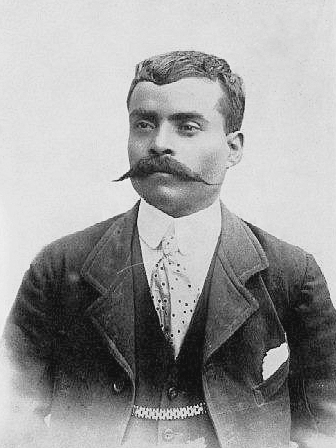
Emiliano Zapata in 1914

Madero retained the Mexican Federal Army and ordered the demobilization of revolutionary forces. For revolutionaries who considered themselves the reason that Díaz resigned, this was a hard course to follow. Since Madero did not implement immediate, radical reforms that many of those who had supported him had expected, he lost control of those areas in Morelos and Chihuahua. A series of internal rebellions challenged Madero's presidency before the February 1913 coup that deposed him.

==== Zapatista rebellion ====
In Morelos, Emiliano Zapata proclaimed the Plan of Ayala on 25 November 1911, which excoriated Madero's slowness on land reform and declared the signatories in rebellion. Zapata's plan recognized Pascual Orozco as fellow revolutionary, although Orozco was for the moment loyal to Madero, until 1912. Madero sent the Federal Army to suppress the rebellion, but failed to do so. For Madero's opponents this was evidence of his ineffectiveness as a leader.

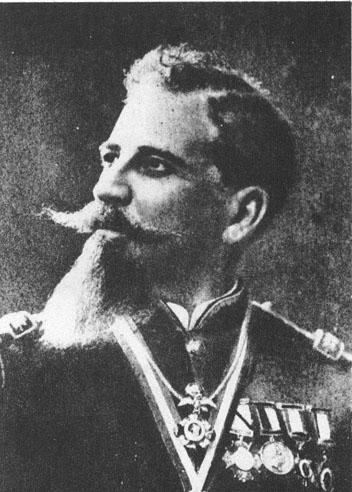
General Bernardo Reyes (1850–1913).

==== Reyes rebellion ====
In December 1911, General Bernardo Reyes, whom Porfirio Díaz had sent to Europe on a diplomatic mission because Díaz worried that Reyes was going to challenge him for the presidency, launched a rebellion in Nuevo León, where he had previously served as governor. He called for "the people" to rise against Madero. "His rebellion was a total failure", lasting only eleven days before Reyes surrendered to the Federal Army at Linares, Nuevo León. When the rebellion broke out, Madero made a calculated decision to entrust Pascual Orozco to put it down. In the fight against Díaz, Orozco had led revolutionary forces in the north capturing Ciudad Juárez, against Madero's orders. Madero had not treated him well after he was elected, but entrusted him over General Victoriano Huerta. Huerta had previously been a supporter of Reyes, and Madero was concerned that Huerta would join with Reyes rather than suppress the rebellion. In one historian's assessment, "President Madero played his political cards perfectly on this occasion. Had he dispatched a large force to the north under the command of either Huerta or General Aureliano Blanquet, it is quite possible that a major military defection would have occurred, seriously threatening the government." Reyes was sent to the Santiago Tlatelolco military prison in Mexico City. Madero allowed Reyes privileges while in prison, which allowed him to organize subsequent conspiracies from jail.

==== Vázquez Gómez rebellion ====
Nearly simultaneous with Reyes's rebellion, Emilio Vázquez Gómez rose in rebellion. Emilio was the brother of Francisco Vázquez Gómez whom Madero replaced as the vice presidential candidate Pino Suárez when he successfully ran for president. Emilio gathered supporters in Chihuahua, with a number of small rebellions against Madero's regime breaking out in December 1911. Although Madero sent the Federal Army, he then sent Orozco to put down the rebellion. Rebels had captured and looted Ciudad Juáréz. Orozco arrived with a contingent of troops. Still popular in Chihuahua, Orozco persuaded rebels to lay down their arms against Madero. Madero was delighted that Orozco had been so successful in dealing with two rebellions.

==== Orozco rebellion ====
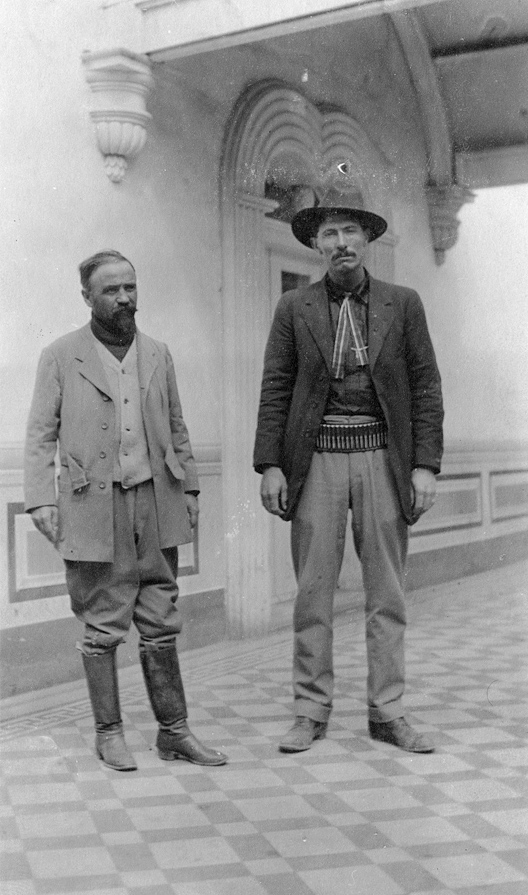
Madero and Pascual Orozco

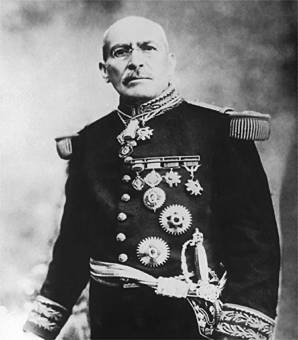
Victoriano Huerta (1850–1916), who suppressed Orozco's rebellion against Madero's government

The two small, northern rebellions that Orozco suppressed showed again his military skills, but with the Vázquez Gómez rebellion, Orozco realized his continued popularity. In his recent dealings with Madero, the president had shown him respect, which had been lacking after Orozco disobeyed Madero's orders not to take Ciudad Juárez in May 1911, since Madero was attempting non-military means to persuade Díaz to resign. Orozco was personally resentful of how President Madero had treated him once he was in office. He launched a rebellion in Chihuahua in March 1912 with the financial backing of Luis Terrazas, a former Governor of Chihuahua who was the largest landowner in Mexico. Northern oligarchs had opposed ousting of Díaz and Madero's presidency and saw in Orozco a potential ally, a rival to oust Madero. They began flattering him that he was the man to bring order to Mexico. Madero's advisors had repeatedly warned Madero that Orozco was untrustworthy, but Madero had just seen the demonstration of Orozco's loyalty in preserving his presidency. Orozco's "revolution came as a complete shock to Madero."

At his request, Madero dispatched troops under General José González Salas, the Secretary of War, to put down the rebellion. González Salas was not a seasoned campaign general, but he did not want Huerta to be dispatched. Unlike the two small, unsuccessful rebellions that attracted few followers, Orozco not only had an army to 8,000 men, he had backing from landowning interests, and a detailed battle plan to sweep through Chihuahua and capture Mexico City. Although González Salas commanded forces of 2,000 troops, he was an ineffective leader. In the first major encounter, Orozco triumphed, crushing the Federal Army. González Salas committed suicide after the military humiliation.

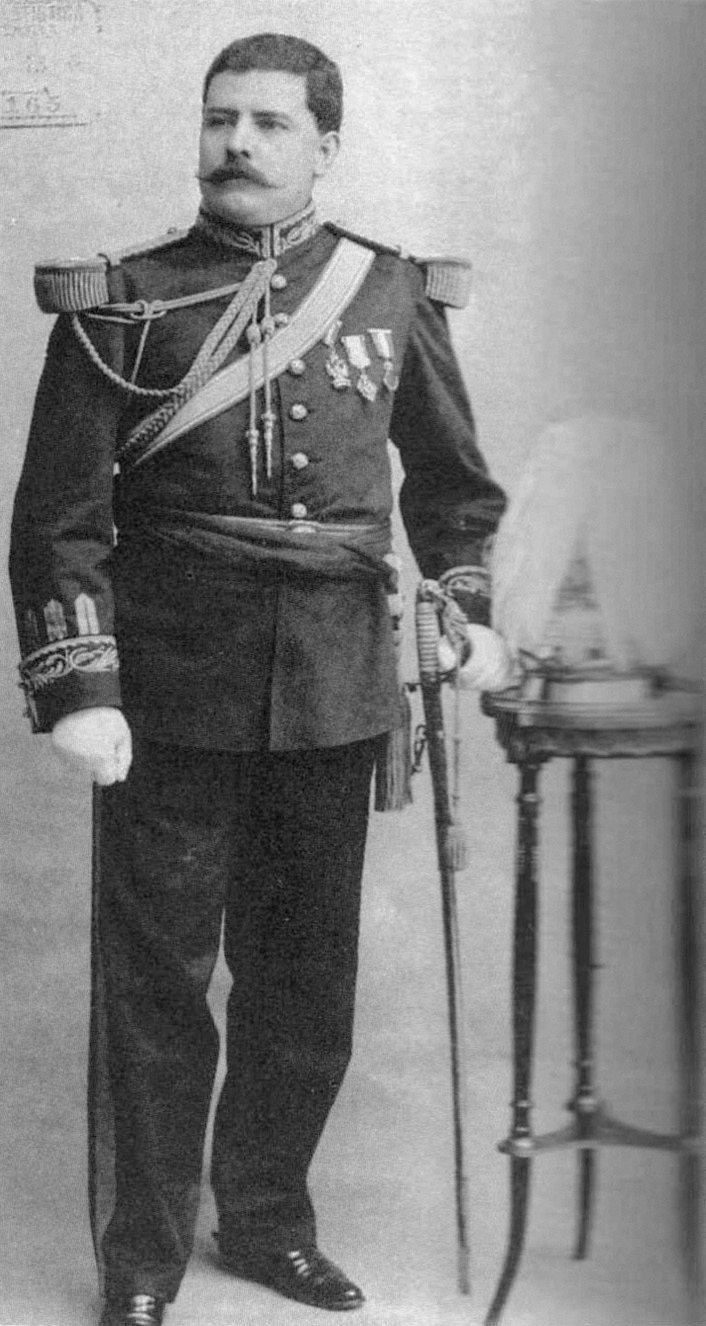
Félix Díaz

General Victoriano Huerta assumed control of the federalist forces. Huerta was more successful, defeating Orozco's troops in three major battles and forcing Orozco to flee to the United States in September 1912.

Relations between Huerta and Madero grew strained during the course of this campaign when Pancho Villa, the commander of the División del Norte, refused orders from General Huerta. Huerta ordered Villa's execution, but Madero commuted the sentence and Villa was sent to the same Santiago Tlatelolco prison as Reyes from which he escaped on Christmas Day 1912. Angry at Madero's commutation of Villa's sentence, Huerta, after a long night of drinking, mused about reaching an agreement with Orozco and together deposing Madero as president. When Mexico's Minister of War learned of General Huerta's comments, he stripped Huerta of his command, but Madero intervened and restored Huerta to command.

==== Félix Díaz rebellion ====
October 1912, Félix Díaz (nephew of Porfirio Díaz) launched a rebellion in Veracruz, hoping to capitalize on his famous name and with support from the U.S. But even with U.S. support, Díaz's rebellion collapsed after no Mexican generals or the general populace supported it. Díaz was arrested and imprisoned. Although Díaz was sentenced to death for his rebellion, the Supreme Court of Mexico, whose judges were appointed by former President Díaz, declared that Félix Díaz would be imprisoned, but not executed. Madero did not interfere with the decision; Díaz was transferred to the same prison where Reyes was incarcerated, where the two plotted further conspiracies. "Madero displayed a fatal softness toward the leaders of these coup attempts.

=== U.S. and the Madero government ===
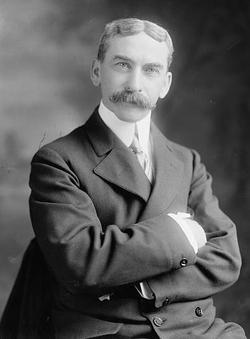
Henry Lane Wilson, ambassador of the United States in Mexico

Initially, the U.S. was cautiously optimistic about Madero leading the new government. He had kept the Federal Army and the federal bureaucracy, and dismissed the revolutionary forces that brought him to power. Although his Plan of San Luis Potosí signaled his openness to land reform, he failed to move on it, which did not have an impact on the U.S. or its business interests. Madero displayed no overt anti-Americanism, but his resistance to U.S. pressure on a variety of issues were taken as that by the U.S. government and business interests. He did not follow through on promises made in his name, perhaps by his brother Gustavo A. Madero, to turn Mexico's oil industry over to the Standard Oil Company. He refused to satisfy U.S. demands for compensation for life and property outside of a bilateral commission. He planned to institute universal male military service, which would have strengthened Mexico's position against foreign powers. Furthermore, Madero's lifting of restrictions on labor organizing had resulted in strikes, which had an impact on U.S. companies in Mexico. Likewise, Madero was not deviating from President Díaz's firmness against demands that infringed on Mexican sovereignty and domestic policy, but the U.S. pressed the issues.

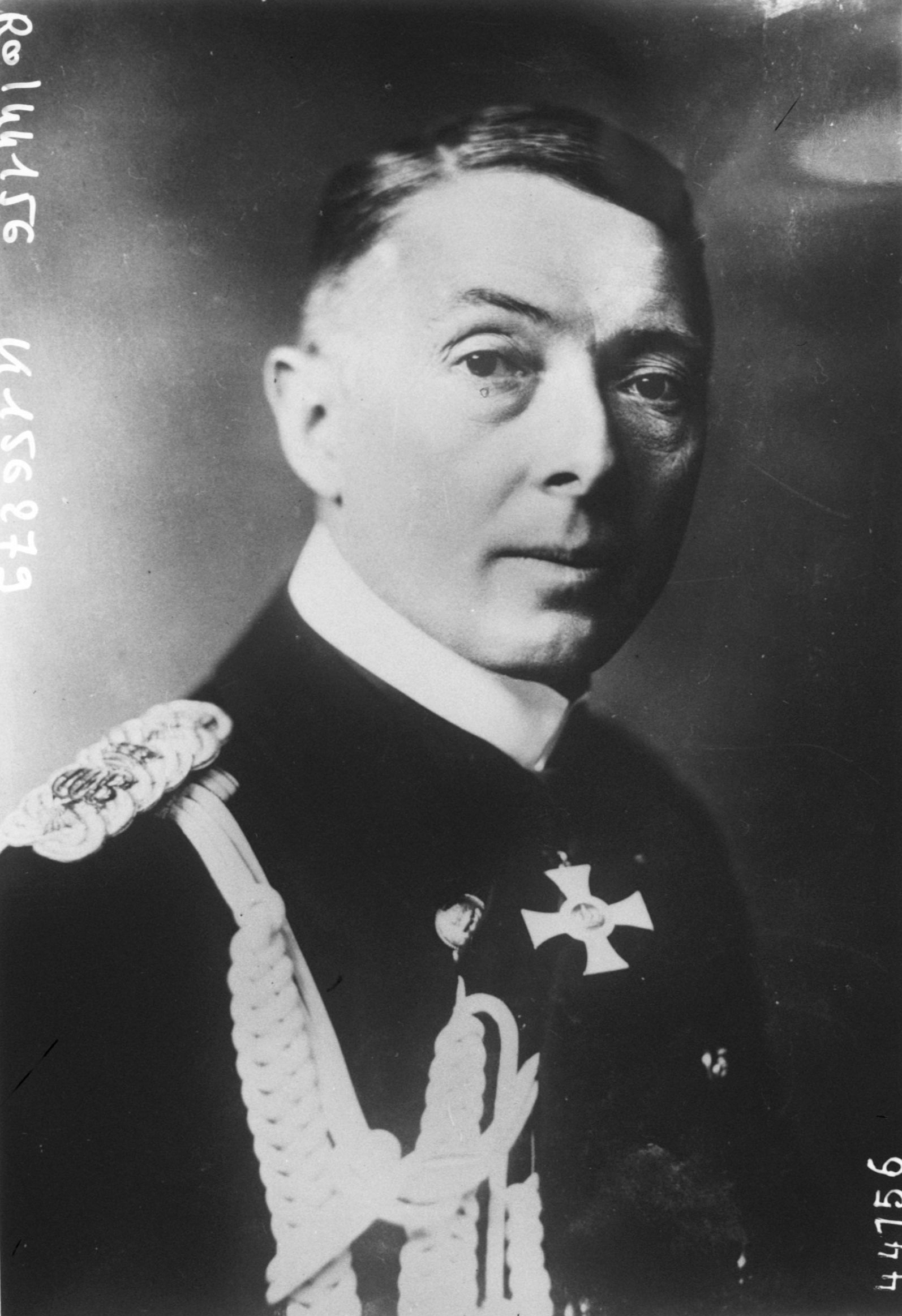
Paul von Hintze

The United States' position towards the Madero regime grew increasingly hostile. The U.S. Ambassador, Henry Lane Wilson conducted a campaign of anti-Madero propaganda and disinformation, aimed at alarming the American residents, a campaign against Madero in U.S. newspapers. The U.S. government and business interests, too, increasingly backed rebellions against Madero.

=== Germany and the Madero government ===
Germany had business interests in Mexico, in banking and in exports from Germany, but it was reluctant to challenge the U.S. as the premier foreign arbiter in Mexico. In the period before the outbreak of World War I in August 1914, it followed the lead of the U.S. of initially being optimistic about Madero's moderation against revolutionary tendencies. But when U.S. turned against Madero, the U.S. ambassador and the German ambassador Paul von Hintze were in close contact. Hintze's reports on the situation in Mexico during the Madero presidency were a rich source of information about the regime. Although the U.S. attempted to draw Germany as well as Great Britain into intervention in Mexico, both held back. They also sought to prevent the U.S. from intervening itself. Hintze had a low opinion of Félix Díaz, and saw the head of the Mexican Federal Army, Victoriano Huerta, as an appropriate candidate as a military dictator. That view dictated his actions as a plan for a coup was hatched in early 1913.

== Successful coup against Madero ==
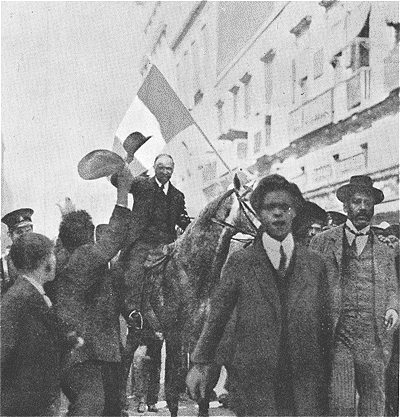
President Madero riding the streets near the Palace, acclaimed by his supporters, a few days before his tragic end.

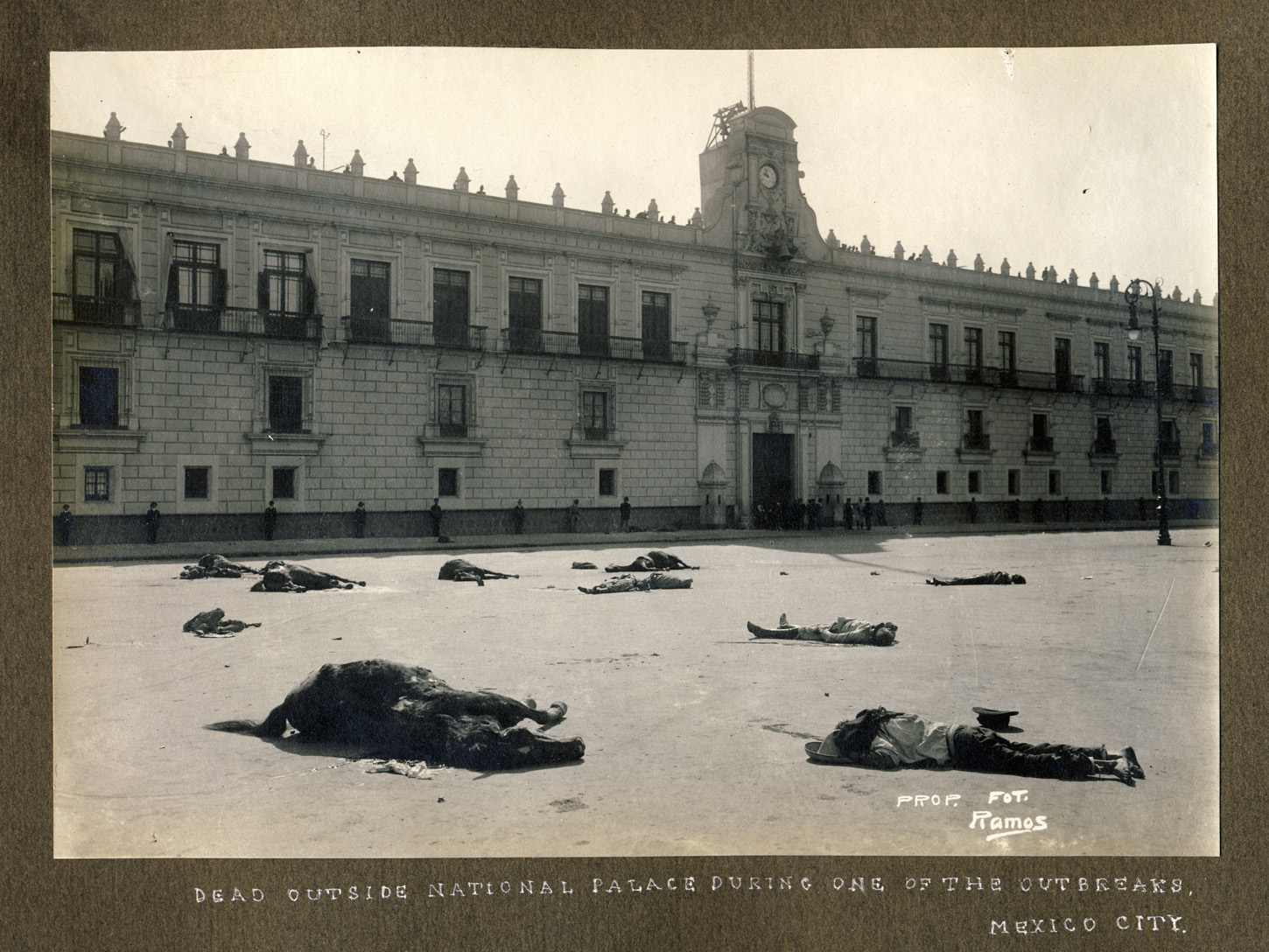
The National Palace, the target of the rebel artillery fire from the nearby arsenal. There were dead bodies in the zócalo and the capital's streets. Photographer, Manuel Ramos.

In early 1913, General Félix Díaz (Porfirio Díaz's nephew) and General Bernardo Reyes plotted the overthrow of Madero. Now known in Mexican history as the Ten Tragic Days, from 9 to 19 February events in the capital led to the overthrow and murder of Madero and his vice president. Rebel forces bombarded the National Palace and downtown Mexico City from the military arsenal (ciudadela). Madero's loyalists initially held their ground, but Madero's commander, General Victoriano Huerta secretly switched sides to support the rebels. Madero's decision to appoint Huerta as commander of forces in Mexico City was one "for which he would pay for with his life." Madero and his vice president were arrested. Under pressure Madero resigned the presidency, with the expectation that he would go into exile, as had President Díaz in May 1911. Madero's brother and advisor Gustavo A. Madero was kidnapped off the street, tortured, and killed. Following Huerta's coup d'état on 18 February 1913, Madero was forced to resign. After a 45-minute term of office, Pedro Lascuráin was replaced by Huerta, who took over the presidency later that day.

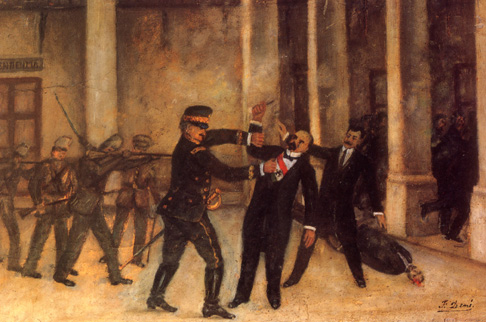
Painting of Madero's capture

Following his forced resignation, Madero and his Vice-president José María Pino Suárez were kept under guard in the National Palace. On the evening of 22 February, they were told that they were to be transferred to the main city penitentiary, where they would be safer. At 11:15 pm, reporters waiting outside the National Palace saw two cars containing Madero and Suárez emerge from the main gate under a heavy escort commanded by Major Francisco Cárdenas, an officer of the rurales. The journalists on foot were outdistanced by the motor vehicles, which were driven towards the penitentiary. The correspondent for the New York World was approaching the prison when he heard a volley of shots. Behind the building, he found the two cars with the bodies of Madero and Suárez nearby, surrounded by soldiers and gendarmes. Major Cárdenas subsequently told reporters that the cars and their escort had been fired on by a group, as they neared the penitentiary. The two prisoners had leapt from the vehicles and ran towards their presumed rescuers. They had however been killed in the cross-fire the night of 22 February. This account was treated with general disbelief, although the American ambassador Henry Lane Wilson, a strong supporter of Huerta, reported to Washington that, "I am disposed to accept the (Huerta) government's version of the affair and consider it a closed incident".

President Madero, dead at 39, was buried quietly in the French cemetery of Mexico City. A series of contemporary photographs taken by Manuel Ramos show Madero's coffin being carried from the penitentiary and placed on a special funeral tram car for transportation to the cemetery. Only his close family were permitted to attend, leaving for Cuba immediately after. Following Huerta's overthrow, Francisco Cárdenas fled to Guatemala, where he committed suicide in 1920 after the new Mexican government had requested his extradition to stand trial for the murder of Madero.

== Aftermath of coup ==
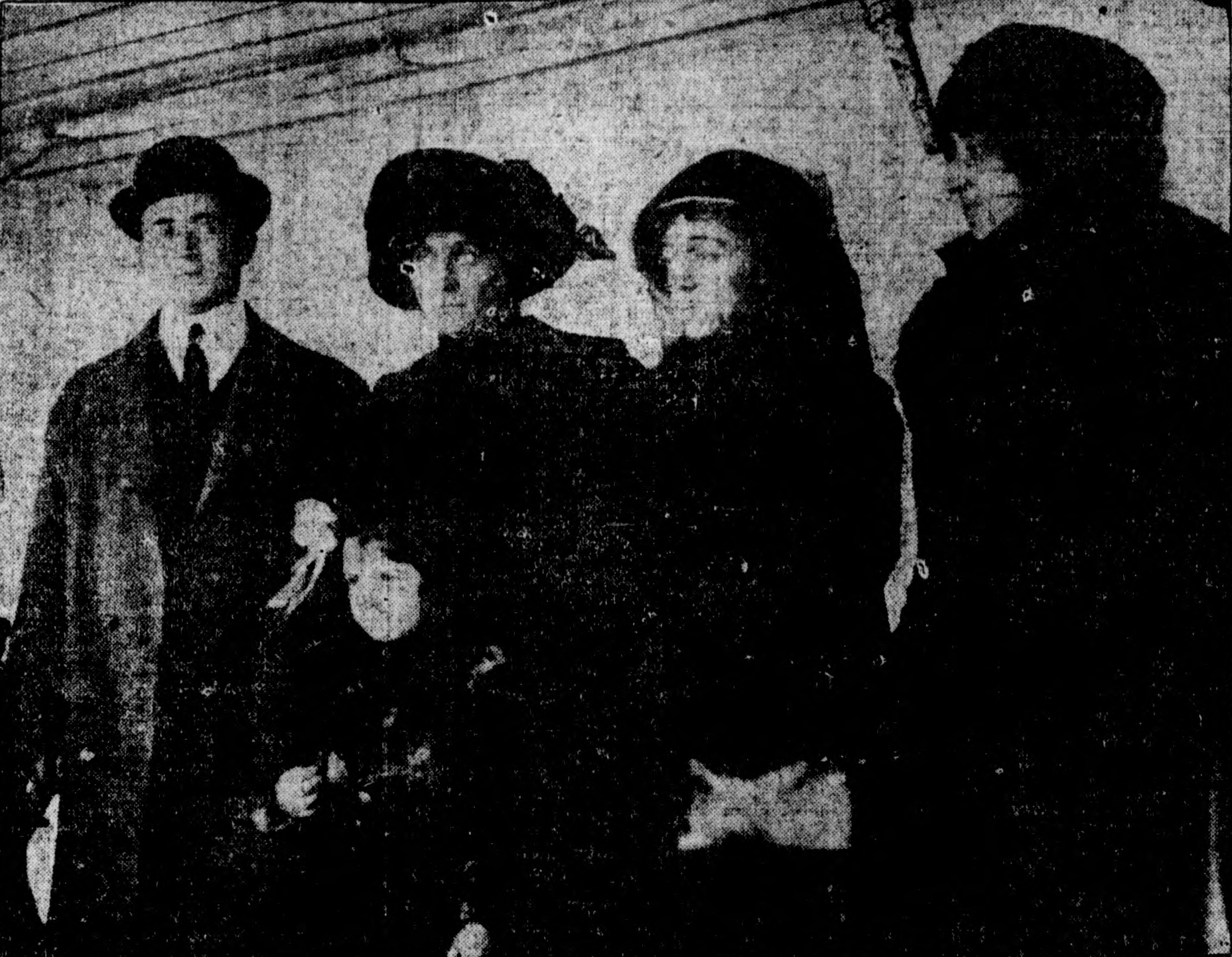
Madero's widow, brother, sisters, and niece upon their arrival in New York City after the assassination, March 1913

There was shock at Madero's murder, but there were many, including Mexican elites and foreign entrepreneurs and governments, who saw the coup and the emergence of General Huerta as the desired strongman to return order to Mexico. Among elites in Mexico, Madero's death was a cause of rejoicing, seeing the time since Díaz's resignation as one of political instability and economic uncertainty. Ordinary Mexicans in the capital, however, were dismayed by the coup, since many considered Madero a friend, but their feelings did not translate into concrete action against the Huerta regime. In northern Mexico, Madero's overthrow and martyrdom united forces against Huerta's usurpation of power. Governor of Coahuila, Venustiano Carranza refused to support the new regime although most state governors had. He brought together a coalition of revolutionaries under the banner of the Mexican Constitution, so that the Constitutionalist Army fought for the principles of constitutional democracy that Madero embraced. In southern Mexico, Zapata had been in rebellion against the Madero government for its slow action on land reform and continued in rebellion against the Huerta regime. However, Zapata repudiated his former high opinion of fellow revolutionary Pascual Orozco, who had also rebelled against Madero, when Orozco allied with Huerta. Madero's anti-reelectionist movement had mobilized revolutionary action that led to the resignation of Díaz. Madero's overthrow and murder during the Ten Tragic Days was a prelude to further years of civil war.

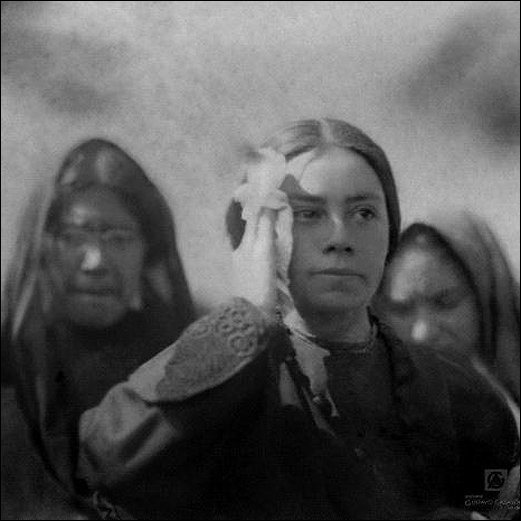
María Arias Bernal, who defended Madero's tomb from vandalism during the counter-revolutionary Victoriano Huerta regime (1913–14).

For Mexicans hopeful of positive change with the Madero presidency, his performance in office was not inspiring, but as a martyr to the revolution ousted and murdered by reactionary forces with the aid of the United States ambassador, he became a powerful unifying force. The Governor of Coahuila, Madero's home state, became the leader of the northern revolutionaries opposing Huerta. Venustiano Carranza had been put in office by Madero. Carranza named the broad-based, anti-Huerta northern coalition the Constitutionalist Army, invoking the Mexican Constitution of 1857 and rule of law that they hoped to restore. In 1915, a Constitutionalist supporter created a chart outlining the political leaders of the time, calling Madero "The Great Democrat, elected president by the unanimous will of the people." But by 1917, when the Constitutionalists had emerged as the winning faction of the revolution, Carranza began reshaping the historical narrative of the revolution that excluded Madero entirely. For Carranza, the revolution had three periods, with the start date being the armed struggle against Huerta, led by himself. After three years as constitutional president, Carranza himself was ousted and killed in a 1920 coup by Sonoran revolutionary generals, Álvaro Obregón, Plutarco Elías Calles, and Adolfo de la Huerta. Madero's status as a hero of the revolution was restored by the Sonoran dynasty, which deliberately constructed a narrative of historical memory that endures. 20 November, the day that Madero set in the Plan of San Luis Potosí for the rebellion against Porfirio Díaz, became a national day of celebration.

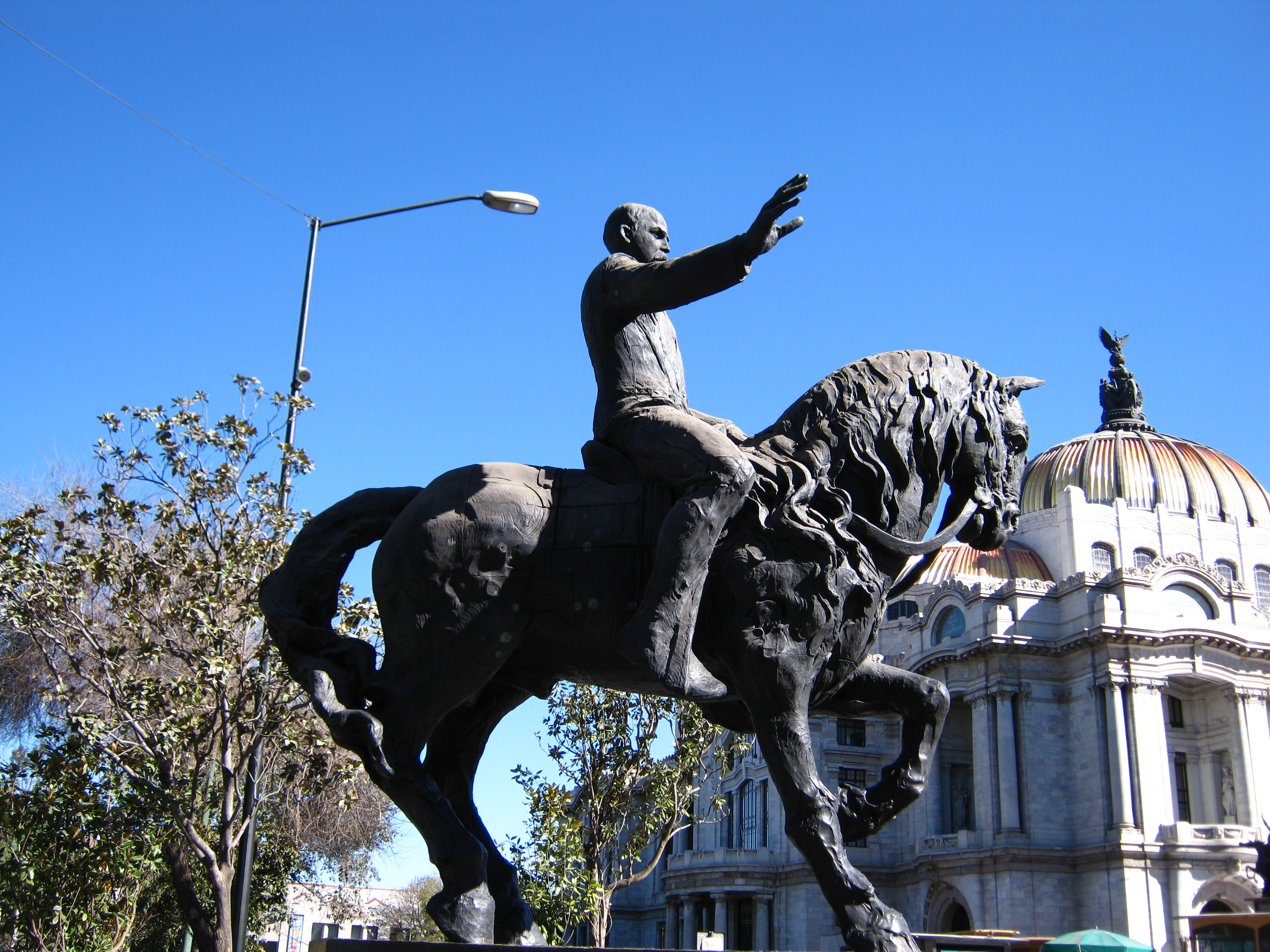
Statue of Madero in front of the Palacio de Bellas Artes in Mexico City.

== Historical memory and popular culture ==
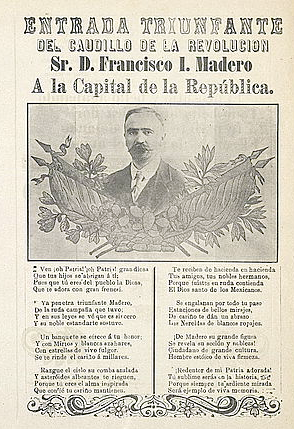
Corrido sheet music celebrating the entry of Francisco Madero into Mexico City in 1911.

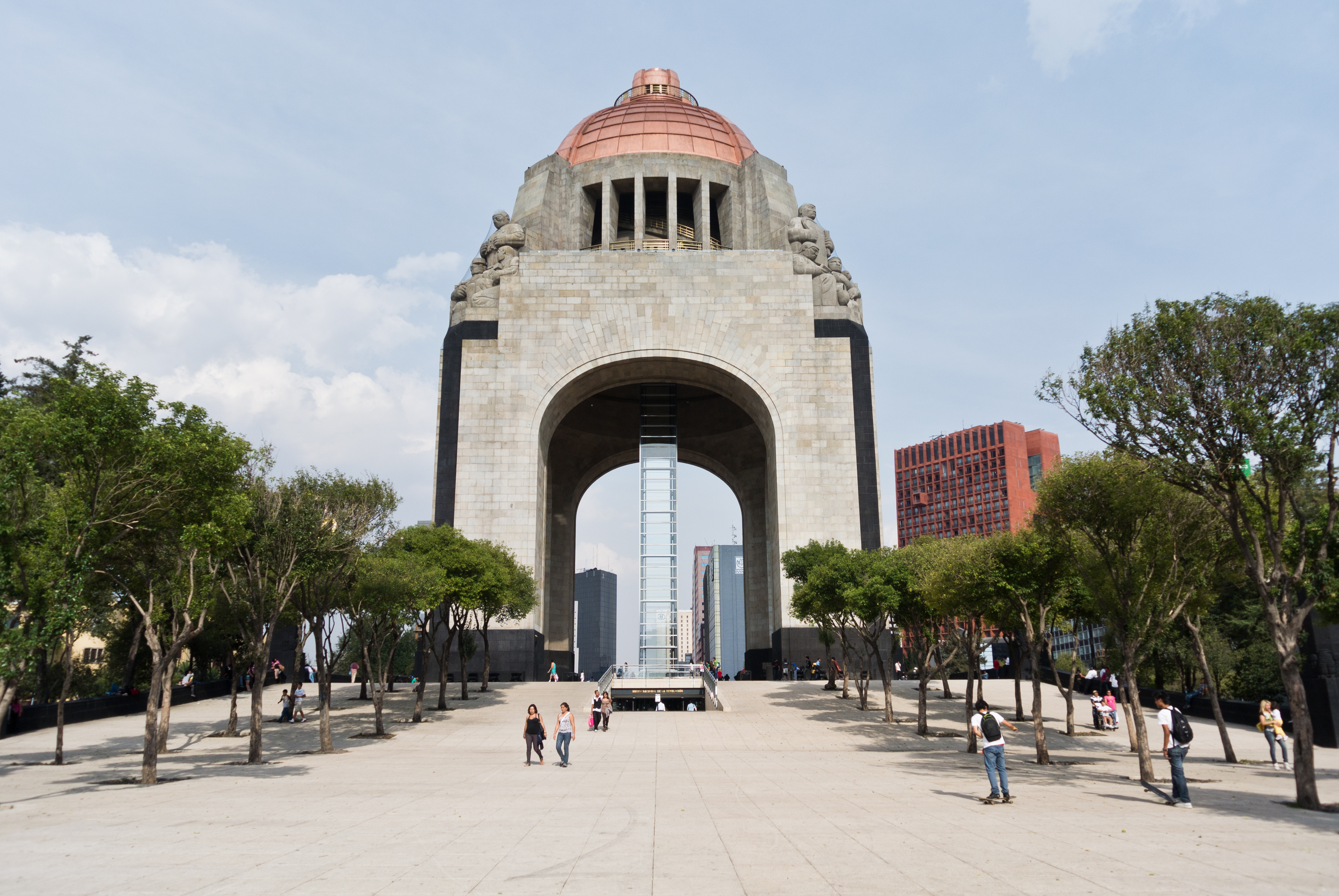
Monument to the Revolution in Mexico City, final resting place of Madero and other revolutionaries

Madero was known as "The Apostle of Democracy," but "Madero the martyr meant more to the soul of Mexico."

Despite Madero's importance as a historical figure, there are relatively few memorials or monuments to him. It was not until the Monument to the Revolution was completed in 1938 that Madero had a public resting place. He had been interred in the French cemetery in Mexico City after his death. His tomb had been an informal pilgrimage site on the anniversary of his murder (22 February) and the proclamation of his Plan of San Luis Potosí (20 November), which launched the Mexican Revolution. Initially, the monument to the Revolution held the remains of Madero, Carranza, and Villa and was planned as a collective commemoration of the Revolution, not individual revolutionaries. Although it was completed on 20 November 1938, there was no inaugural ceremony.

The date of Madero's Plan of San Luis Potosí, 20 November, was a fixed official holiday in Mexico, Revolution Day, but a 2005 change in the law makes the third Monday in November the day of commemoration. During the presidency of Venustiano Carranza, he ignored 20 November and commemorated 26 March, the anniversary of his Plan de Guadalupe.

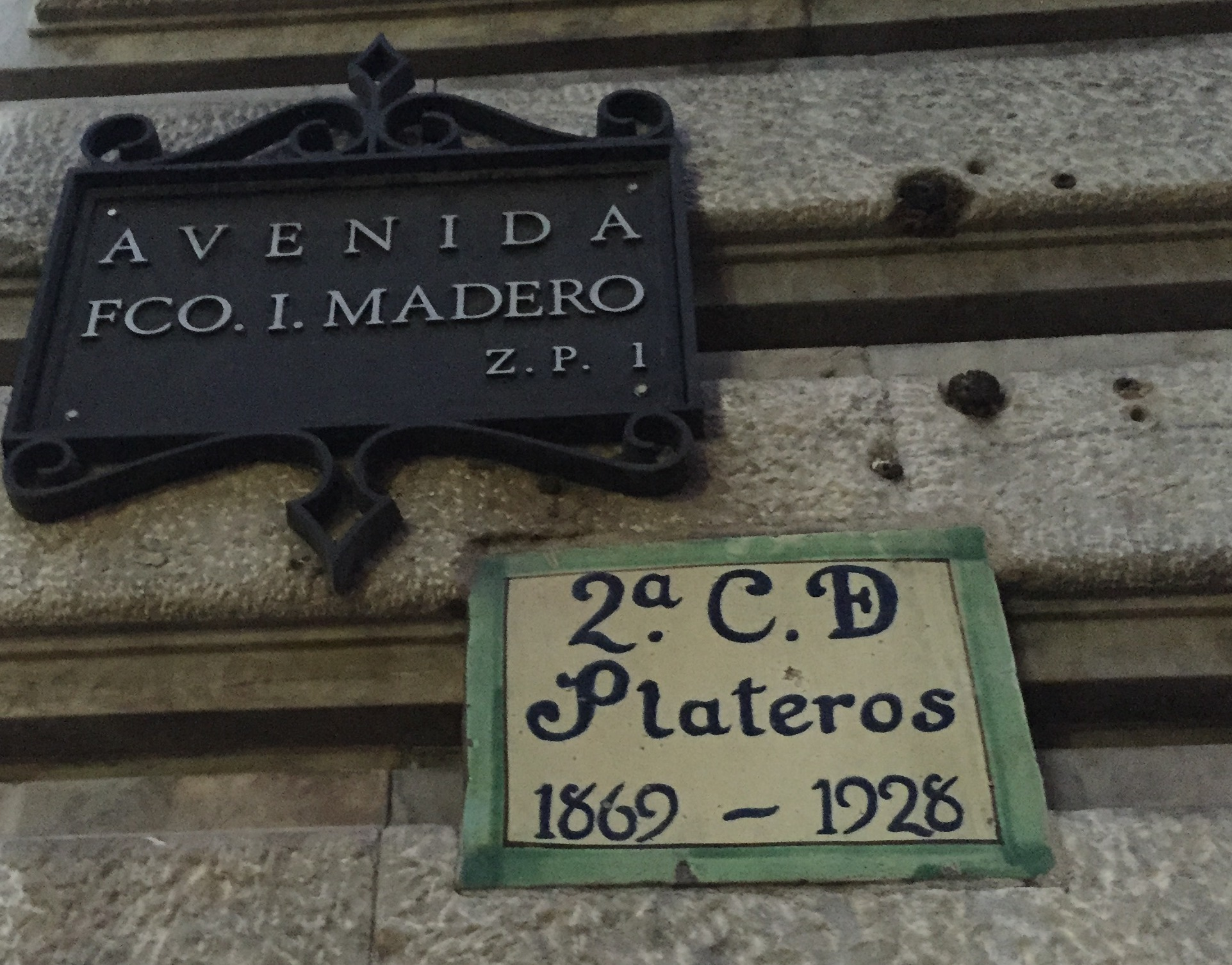
Modern street sign and plaque with the former name of the section, Calle de Plateros.

The Mexico City Metro has a stop named for Madero's vice president, Metro Pino Suárez, but not one to Madero. General Alvaro Obregón laid a foundation stone on the 10th anniversary of Madero's death of a planned Madero statue in the zócalo, but the statue was never built. A statue was erected in 1956 at a downtown intersection in Mexico City and has been moved to the presidential residence, Los Pinos, not easily viewable by the public. An exception is Avenida Madero in Mexico City. One contemporaneous honor by General Pancho Villa remains in Mexico City. On the morning of 8 December 1914, he declared that the street leading from the Zócalo in Mexico City towards the Paseo de la Reforma would be named for Madero. Still officially called Francisco I. Madero Avenue, but commonly known simply as Madero street, it is one of the most popular and historically significant streets in the city. It was pedestrianised in 2009.

Madero is perhaps memorialized in history as the first sitting president to fly in an airplane with English pilot George Dyott on November 30, 1911.

Mexican artist José Guadalupe Posada created an etching for a broadside, produced on the occasion of Madero's election in 1910, titled "Calavera de Madero" portraying Madero as a calavera.

Madero appears in the films Viva Villa! (1934), Villa Rides (1968) and Viva Zapata! (1952).

In the novel The Friends of Pancho Villa (1996) by James Carlos Blake, Madero is a major character.

Along with Hermila Galindo and Carmen Serdán, Madero appears on the obverse of the 1000 Mexican peso banknote issued from 2020.

Madero and his family are described in a very positive light in All the Pretty Horses, a prize-winning novel by Cormac McCarthy.

== See also ==
- List of heads of state of Mexico
- Emilio Madero, brother
- Ernesto Madero, uncle
- Gustavo A. Madero, brother
- Manifiesto a la Nación (Francisco I. Madero)
- Mexican Revolution
- History of Mexico
- Porfirio Díaz
- Abraham González (governor)
- Maderism
- List of heads of state and government who were assassinated or executed

Political offices
Preceded by Francisco León de la Barra	President of Mexico; 6 November 1911 – 19 February 1913	Succeeded by Pedro Lascuráin
