= Battle of Casas Grandes =

Battle of Casa Grandes
- Part of the Mexican Revolution
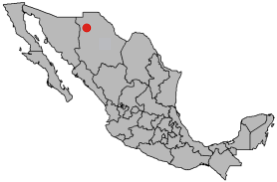
- Casas Grande in Chihuahua.
Date	March 6, 1911
Location	Casas Grandes, Chihuahua, Mexico
Result	Government victory

Belligerents
Maderistas	Government: Federal Army

Commanders and leaders
General Francisco Madero	Colonel Agustín A. Valdez; Colonel Samuel G. Cuellar

Strength
~600 rebels	~1,100 infantry, cavalry, 2 artillery pieces

Casualties and losses
58 killed, unknown wounded, 41 captured	37 killed, 60 wounded

The Battle of Casas Grandes was fought in March 1911 between the federal Mexican Army loyal to President Porfirio Díaz and rebels under Gen. Francisco I. Madero. Rebel forces attacked the town of Casas Grandes, Chihuahua, but were driven back by the federal garrison.

== Battle ==
Francisco I. Madero was leading a rebel army of about 800 troops when he attacked Casas Grandes. Several of Madero's men were in fact American citizens from the border states. The garrison included just over 500 infantry, who were commanded by Col. Agustín A. Valdez of Mexico's 18th Battalion. Gen. Madero and his men attacked the federal positions in Casas Grandes at 5:00 am. Fighting lasted for just over two hours until 7:15 am, when another Mexican government column of 562 men reinforced the already engaged 500 troops. With the reinforcing federals were two mortars, which were quickly put into use.

The battle continued for several hours more, as the federals and rebels repulsed each other's counter-attacks. By 5:00 pm the battle was over when Gen. Madero ordered the retreat of his forces. The Mexican garrison lost 13 men killed in the battle and another 23 wounded. The reinforcing column lost 24 men and 37 injured, including their commander, Col. Samuel G. Cuellar. Both Gen. Madero and Col. Cuellar were wounded. The rebels lost 58 killed and an unknown number of wounded and 41 captured. Of the rebel casualties, 15 of the dead were Americans, along with 17 of the captured.

== Aftermath ==
In addition to casualties, the rebels lost about 150 horses, 153 mules and 101 firearms. Madero blamed his scouts for his defeat at Casas Grandes. He later issued a statement saying that it was his scouts' inability to detect the reinforcing federal column that led to the defeat. All the scouts were subsequently hanged under Gen. Madero's orders.

== See also ==
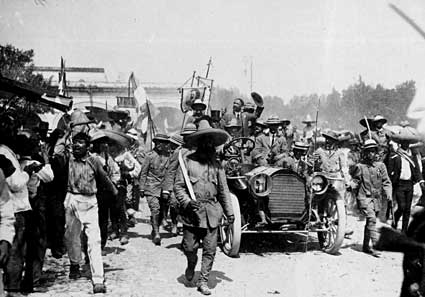
Francisco Madero and his army in Cuernavaca, Mexico, June 1911.

- Pancho Villa Expedition
