= Ernesto Madero =

Mexican politician (1872–1958)

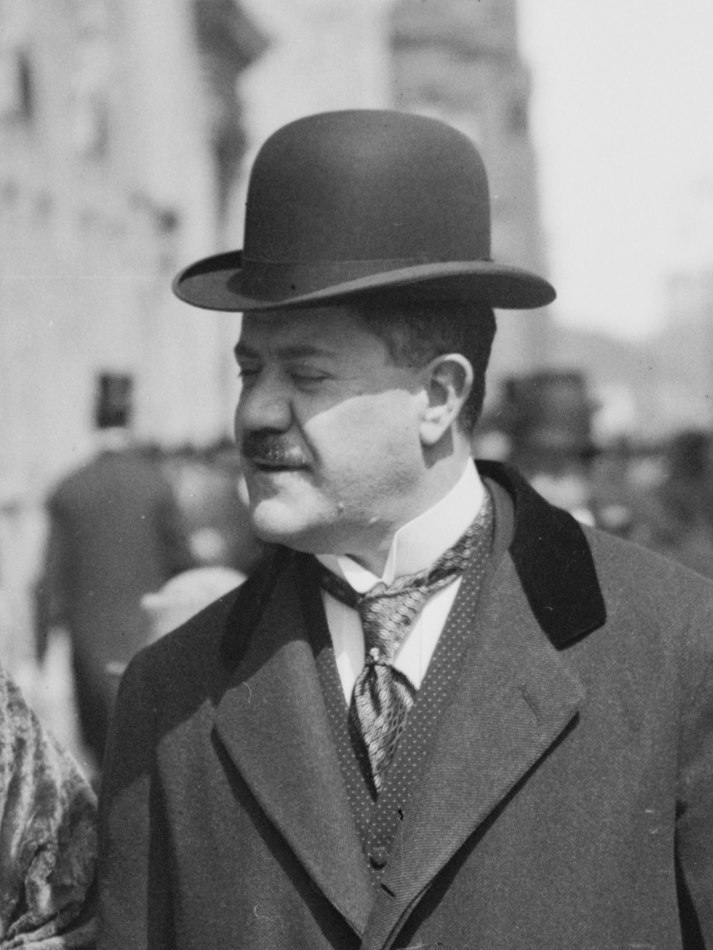
- Madero, c. 1910–1915

Mexican Secretary of Finance
- In office 25 May 1911 – 18 February 1913
- Preceded by: José Yves Limantour
- Succeeded by: Toribio Esquivel Obregón

Personal details
- Born: Ernesto Madero Farías; 12 October 1872 Parras, Coahuila
- Died: 2 February 1958 (aged 85) Mexico City
- Resting place: Family crypt at the Spanish Cemetery of Mexico City
- Relations: Francisco I. Madero, Gustavo A. Madero, Emilio Madero, Raúl Madero (nephews)
- Parent(s): Evaristo Madero Elizondo and Manuela Farías Benavides
- Education: Johns Hopkins University and HEC Paris

Ernesto Madero Farías (12 October 1872 – 2 February 1958) was a Mexican banker who served as Secretary of Finance in the cabinet of President Francisco León de la Barra, and in that of his nephew, President Francisco I. Madero.

He was born in Parras, Coahuila, in 1872, as the eldest of the eleven children of Evaristo Madero Elizondo, governor of Coahuila, and his second wife Manuela Farías Benavides, daughter of Juan Francisco Farías, founder of the Republic of the Rio Grande.

He studied at the Johns Hopkins University in the United States and then mining engineering and economics at the École des Haute Etudes in Paris.

Back home, he managed several of his family's companies, including mines, wineries, industries and agricultural assets. He was part of the first board of the Fundidora de Fierro y Acero de Monterrey S.A as well as director of the Banco de Nuevo León, based in Monterrey.

He belonged, alongside his relative Rafael L. Hernández (Secretary of State of President Francisco Madero), to a group led by José Yves Limantour (Secretary of Finance of President Porfirio Díaz).

He defended his family's interests when his nephew Francisco Madero took arms against President Porfirio Díaz, giving detailed account of his family's extensive assets.

In 1911 he was named Secretary of Finance in the government of Francisco León de la Barra, which immediately succeeded the presidency after the fall of General Porfirio Díaz. When his nephew Francisco Madero succeeded the presidency after democratic elections, he was confirmed in his position, in which he remained until the Ten Tragic Days and the president's assassination.

He married Leonor Olivares Tapia (with issue).
