= Mexico City Metrobús Line 7 =

Bus route in Mexico City

Metrobús Line 7
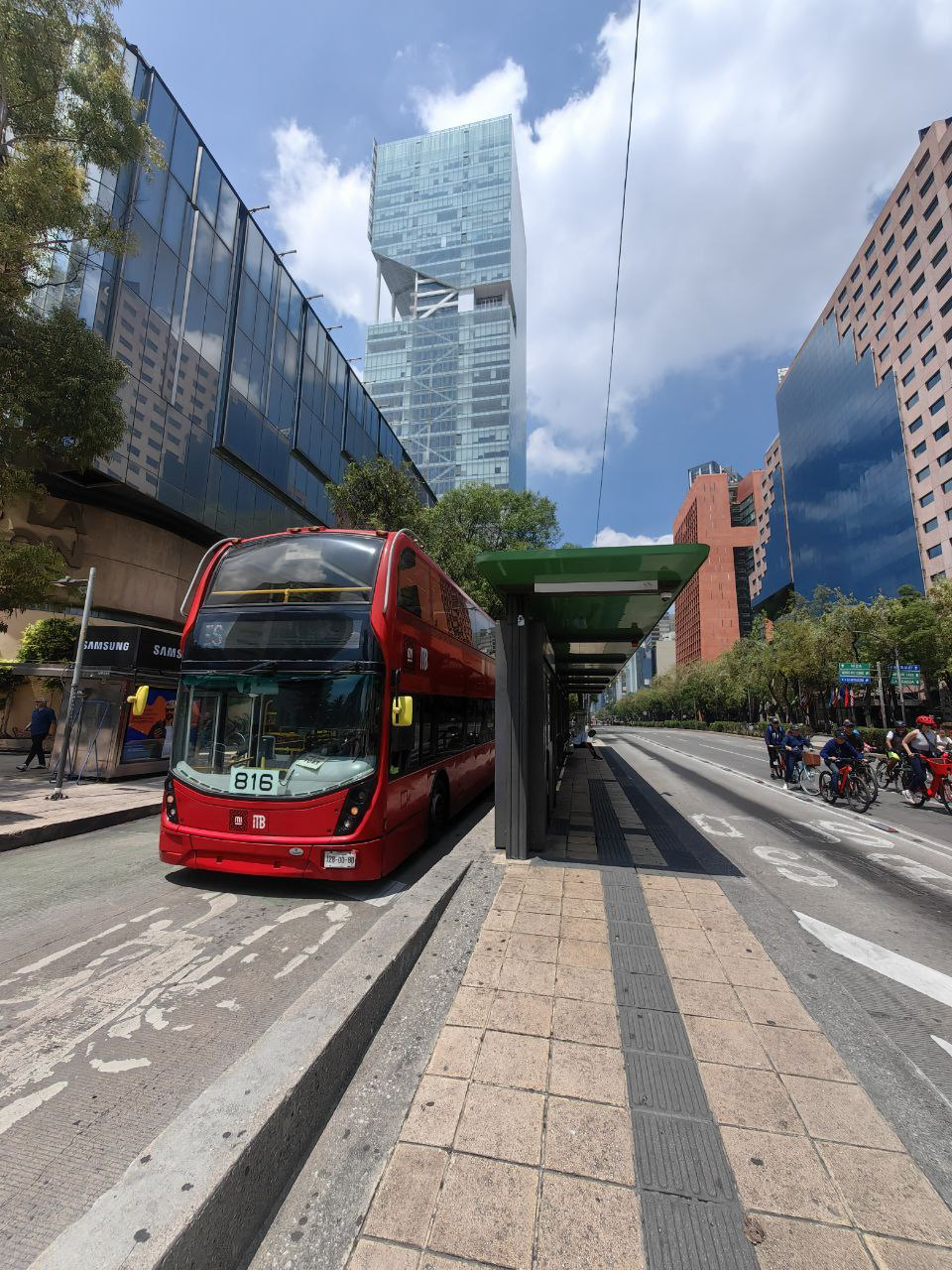
- Double-decker Metrobús unit at Paseo de la Reforma

Overview
- Status: In service
- Termini: Campo Marte; Indios Verdes / Hospital Infantil La Villa / Glorieta Cuitláhuac / Garibaldi Mercado Lagunilla
- Stations: 32
- Website: Línea 7

Service
- Type: Bus rapid transit
- System: Mexico City Metrobús
- Services: 7
- Operator(s): See Operators
- Daily ridership: 130,000

History
- Opened: March 5, 2018; 8 years ago

Technical
- Line length: 15 km (9.3 mi)
- Character: Exclusive right-of-way

The Mexico City Metrobús Line 7 is a bus rapid transit line in the Mexico City Metrobús. It operates between Campo Marte in the Miguel Hidalgo borough and Indios Verdes, in Gustavo A. Madero in the northern part of the city. This is the newest line, inaugurated in March 2018.

The line, known as Corredor Reforma, runs through Paseo de la Reforma, Calzada de los Misterios and Prolongación de los Misterios.

Line 7 was inaugurated by Miguel Ángel Mancera, Head of Government of the Federal District from 2012 to 2018. The line had a cost of 2.8 billion pesos.

The line has 31 stations and a total length of 15 kilometers. Low floor, double-decker buses for this line were produced by Alexander Dennis and are of type Enviro500 MMC. An additional service with two other stations was added in 2023.

== Service description ==
=== Services ===
The line has seven itineraries.

Indios Verdes to Campo Marte

To Campo Marte
- First Bus: 4:30 (Monday-Friday)
- Last Bus: 00:00 (Monday-Friday)
- First Bus: 4:30 (Saturday)
- Last Bus: 00:00 (Saturday)
- First Bus: 5:00 (Sunday)
- Last Bus: 6:00 (Sunday)

To Indios Verdes
- First Bus: 5:05 (Monday-Friday)
- Last Bus: 00:45 (Monday-Friday)
- First Bus: 5:55 (Saturday)
- Last Bus: 00:45 (Saturday)
- First Bus: 5:45 (Sunday)
- Last Bus: 6:20 (Sunday)

Hospital Infantil La Villa to Campo Marte

To Campo Marte
- First Bus: 5:10 (Monday-Friday)
- Last Bus: 21:30 (Monday-Friday)
- First Bus: 5:05 (Saturday)
- Last Bus: 21:30 (Saturday)
No service on Sunday

From Campo Marte
- First Bus: 5:55 (Monday-Friday)
- Last Bus: 22:15 (Monday-Friday)
- First Bus: 5:55 (Saturday)
- Last Bus: 22:15 (Saturday)
No service on Sunday

Glorieta Cuitláhuac to Campo Marte

To Campo Marte
- First Bus: 7:00 (Monday-Friday)
- Last Bus: 20:30 (Monday-Friday)
No service on Saturday and Sunday

From Campo Marte
- First Bus: 7:25 (Monday-Friday)
- Last Bus: 21:00 (Monday-Friday)
No service on Saturday and Sunday

Indios Verdes to La Diana

From Indios Verdes
No service from Monday to Saturday
- First Bus: 6:05 (Sunday)
- Last Bus: 13:15 (Sunday)

To Indios Verdes
No service from Monday to Saturday
- First Bus: 6:45 (Sunday)
- Last Bus: 13:55 (Sunday)

Indios Verdes to Campo Marte

To Campo Marte
No service from Monday to Saturday
- First Bus: 13:25 (Sunday)
- Last Bus: 00:00 (Sunday)

To Indios Verdes
No service from Monday to Saturday
- First Bus: 14:15 (Sunday)
- Last Bus: 00:45 (Sunday)

Hospital Infantil La Villa to La Diana

To La Diana
No service from Monday to Saturday
- First Bus: 6:15 (Sunday)
- Last Bus: 13:15 (Sunday)

To Hospital Infantil La Villa
No service from Monday to Saturday
- First Bus: 6:50 (Sunday)
- Last Bus: 13:55 (Sunday)

Hospital Infantil La Villa to Campo Marte

To Campo Marte
No service from Monday to Saturday
- First Bus: 13:25 (Sunday)
- Last Bus: 21:30 (Sunday)

From Campo Marte
No service from Monday to Saturday
- First Bus: 14:10 (Sunday)
- Last Bus: 22:15 (Sunday)

Garibaldi Mercado Lagunilla to Campo Marte

To Garibaldi Mercado Lagunilla
To Campo Marte

The line 7 services the Miguel Hidalgo, Cuauhtémoc and Gustavo A. Madero boroughs.

=== Station list ===
Key (Note: The following list was adapted from different websites and official maps.: Metro connections obtained from the official Mexico City Metro system map.; Accessibility obtained from the Mexico City Metro system map. In some cases, the map omits the accessibility icon as the station(s) are actually partially accessible. However, the respective websites of each station on the official site indicate the respective accessibility methods. Stations with the symbol ‡ are fully accessible; stations with the symbol † are partially accessible.; Cablebús obtained from their official website.; Centro de transferencia modal (CETRAM;) obtained from the official website of the Órgano Regulador de Transporte.; Ecobici obtained from their official website.; Metrobús obtained from the Mexico City Metrobús system map.; Mexibús obtained from the official Mexico City Metro system map.; Mexicable obtained from the official Mexico City Metro system map.; Public buses network (peseros) obtained from the official website of the Órgano Regulador de Transporte.; Red de Transporte de Pasajeros obtained from their official website.; Trolleybuses obtained from their official website.)
Handicapped/disabled access	Fully accessible station	Cablebús Line {{{3}}}	Cablebús connection	Red de Transporte de Pasajeros	RTP connection
Handicapped/disabled access	Partially accessible station	Mexibús	Mexibús connection	Tren Interurbano	Tren Interurbano connection
Transfer hub	CETRAM transfer station	Mexicable	Mexicable connection	Tren Suburbano	Tren Suburbano connection
Transfer hub	ETRAM transfer station	Mexico City Metro	Mexico City Metro connection	Trolleybus	Trolleybus connection
Ecobici	Ecobici bikeshare	Mexico City minubus	Pesero connection	Xochimilco Light Rail	Xochimilco Light Rail connection

Station (Note: All the stations are fully accessible to people with disabilities.)	Connections	Neighborhood(s)	Borough	Picture	Date opened
Campo Marte	76, 76A; 8B, 8C, 8D, 18D; Various intercity bus routes	Polanco	Miguel Hidalgo		March 5, 2018
Auditorio	76, 76A, 300A; 8B, 8C, 8D, 18D	Polanco	Miguel Hidalgo		March 5, 2018
Antropología	8B, 8C, 8D, 18D	Polanco	Miguel Hidalgo		March 5, 2018
Gandhi	8B, 8C, 8D, 18D	Polanco	Miguel Hidalgo		March 5, 2018
Chapultepec	11A, 13A, 34A, 115A, 200 (all at distance); 7D, 8A, 8B, 8C, 8D, 13C, 13E, 18C, 18D, 19E, 19F, 19G, 19H, 21A (all at distance); Various intercity bus routes	Colonia Cuauhtémoc; Juárez	Cuauhtémoc		March 5, 2018
La Diana	19, 19A	Colonia Cuauhtémoc; Juárez	Cuauhtémoc		March 5, 2018
El Ángel	19, 19A	Colonia Cuauhtémoc; Juárez	Cuauhtémoc		March 5, 2018
El Ahuehuete (Note: Formerly named "La Palma".)	Ecobici	Colonia Cuauhtémoc; Juárez	Cuauhtémoc		March 5, 2018
Hamburgo	Mexico City Metrobús Mexico City Metrobús Line 1 Ecobici	Colonia Cuauhtémoc; Juárez	Cuauhtémoc		March 5, 2018
Reforma	19H (at distance); (at distance)	Tabacalera; Juárez	Cuauhtémoc		March 5, 2018
París		Tabacalera; Juárez	Cuauhtémoc		March 5, 2018
Amajac (Note: Formerly named "Glorieta de Colón".)	19H	Tabacalera; Centro	Cuauhtémoc		March 5, 2018
El Caballito	(at Hidalgo)	Tabacalera; Centro	Cuauhtémoc		March 5, 2018
Hidalgo	27A; 16A; (at distance)	Guerrero; Centro	Cuauhtémoc		March 5, 2018
Glorieta Violeta	(at Lerdo); 27A	Guerrero	Cuauhtémoc		March 5, 2018
Garibaldi Mercado Lagunilla (Note: Formerly named "Garibaldi".)	(at Garibaldi/Lagunilla); (at Garibaldi); 18, 27A; 10E, 11C	Guerrero; Centro	Cuauhtémoc		March 5, 2018
Glorieta Cuitláhuac	(at Av. Ricardo Flores Magón); 18	Guerrero; Morelos	Cuauhtémoc		March 5, 2018
Tres Culturas	(at Constancia or Tlatelolco)	Tlatelolco; Morelos	Cuauhtémoc		March 5, 2018
Peralvillo	(at Canal del Norte or Manuel González); 10B	Ex Hipódromo de Peralvillo; Morelos	Cuauhtémoc		March 5, 2018
Mercado Beethoven	(at Juventino Rosas); 20B	Peralvillo	Cuauhtémoc		March 5, 2018
Misterios	Line 5; (at Río Consulado); 200; 20A	Peralvillo; Vallejo	Gustavo A. Madero/ Cuauhtémoc		March 5, 2018
Clave	(at Donizetti)	Vallejo	Gustavo A. Madero		March 5, 2018
Robles Domínguez	(at Calzada de los Misterios); 11A, 12	Vallejo	Gustavo A. Madero		March 5, 2018
Excélsior	Trolleybus Trolleybus Line 5	Colonia Industrial	Gustavo A. Madero		March 5, 2018
Necaxa	(at Victoria)	Colonia Industrial	Gustavo A. Madero		March 5, 2018
Avenida Talismán	(at Euzkaro); 10A, 10B, 10C	Colonia Industrial	Gustavo A. Madero		March 5, 2018
Garrido	(at La Villa-Basílica)	Tepeyac Insurgentes	Gustavo A. Madero		March 5, 2018
Delegación Gustavo A. Madero (Note: Accessible from Campo Marte to Indios Verdes)	107B; (at Cuauhtémoc)	Villa Gustavo A. Madero	Gustavo A. Madero		March 5, 2018
Hospital Infantil La Villa	101A, 101B, 101D, 107B	Villa Gustavo A. Madero; Estanzuela	Gustavo A. Madero		March 5, 2018
De los Misterios (Note: Accessible from Indios Verdes to Campo Marte)	(at Av. Montevideo); 101A, 101B, 101D, 107B	Tepeyac Insurgentes; Villa Gustavo A. Madero	Gustavo A. Madero		March 5, 2018
Indios Verdes	101, 101A, 101B, 101D, 102, 107B (at distance), 108; Various local and intercity bus routes	Residencial Zacatenco	Gustavo A. Madero		March 5, 2018

=== Alameda Tacubaya service ===
Following the temporary closure of Mexico City Metro Line 1, the temporary Alameda Tacubaya–París route was established on 9 November 2023. The service ran along Line 7 to Chapultepec station, where it deviated toward the De la Salle bus station and terminated at the Alameda Tacubaya bus stop, near Tacubaya metro station. The service was later extended to Glorieta Cuitláhuac bus stop on 24 March 2024. On 29 December 2025, the system announced the closure of the service following the resumption of Line 1 operations; however, commuters called for it to be made permanent on social media. The following day, the system announced its indefinite continuation.

Stations (Note: All the stations are fully accessible to people with disabilities.)	Connections	Neighborhood(s)	Borough	Picture	Date opened
Chapultepec	11A, 13A, 34A, 115A, 200; 7D, 8A, 8B, 8C, 8D, 13C, 13E, 18C, 18D, 19E, 19F, 19G, 19H, 21A; Various intercity bus routes	Colonia Cuauhtémoc; Juárez	Cuauhtémoc		
De La Salle	13A, 115A, 200	Hipódromo Condesa; Escandón	Cuauhtémoc; Miguel Hidalgo		
Alameda Tacubaya	110, 110B, 110C, 112, 113B, 115, 118, 119, 200; 1B, 9C, 9E, 21A; Various intercity bus routes	Tacubaya	Miguel Hidalgo		

=== Operators ===
- Operadora Línea 7, SA de CV (OL7)
- Sky Bus Reforma, SA de CV (SBR)

== Ridership ==
As of March 2018, it is estimated that 130,000 passengers use Line 7 every day.

== Incidents ==
On March 9, 2018, a Metrobus unit crashed against a car, when the car driver turned left without noticing that the bus was coming towards the car.
