= Jesuit Migrant Service, Mexico =

Coordinates: 19°25′19.41″N 99°9′38.9″W

- Abbreviation: SJM-Mexico
- Established: 2001; 25 years ago
- Headquarters: Orizaba 39; Cuauhtémoc, Mexico City
- Affiliations: Jesuit, Catholic
- Website: SJM-Mexico

Jesuit Migrant Service, Mexico (SJM-Mexico) was founded by the Society of Jesus in 2001, to offer a variety of services for the many migrants passing into, through, or out of Mexico, and to their families.

== Services ==
SJM's special assistance to separated families included a pastoral letter and the program "Women and the Migrant Family" in the Diocese of San Andrés Tuxtla, Veracruz, Mexico.

SJM was instrumental in organizing the Documentation of the Network of Organizations for the Defense of Migrants in 2013.
