= Colonia Atlampa =

Coordinates: 19°27′26.37″N 99°9′14.92″W

Atlampa
- Neighborhood of Mexico City
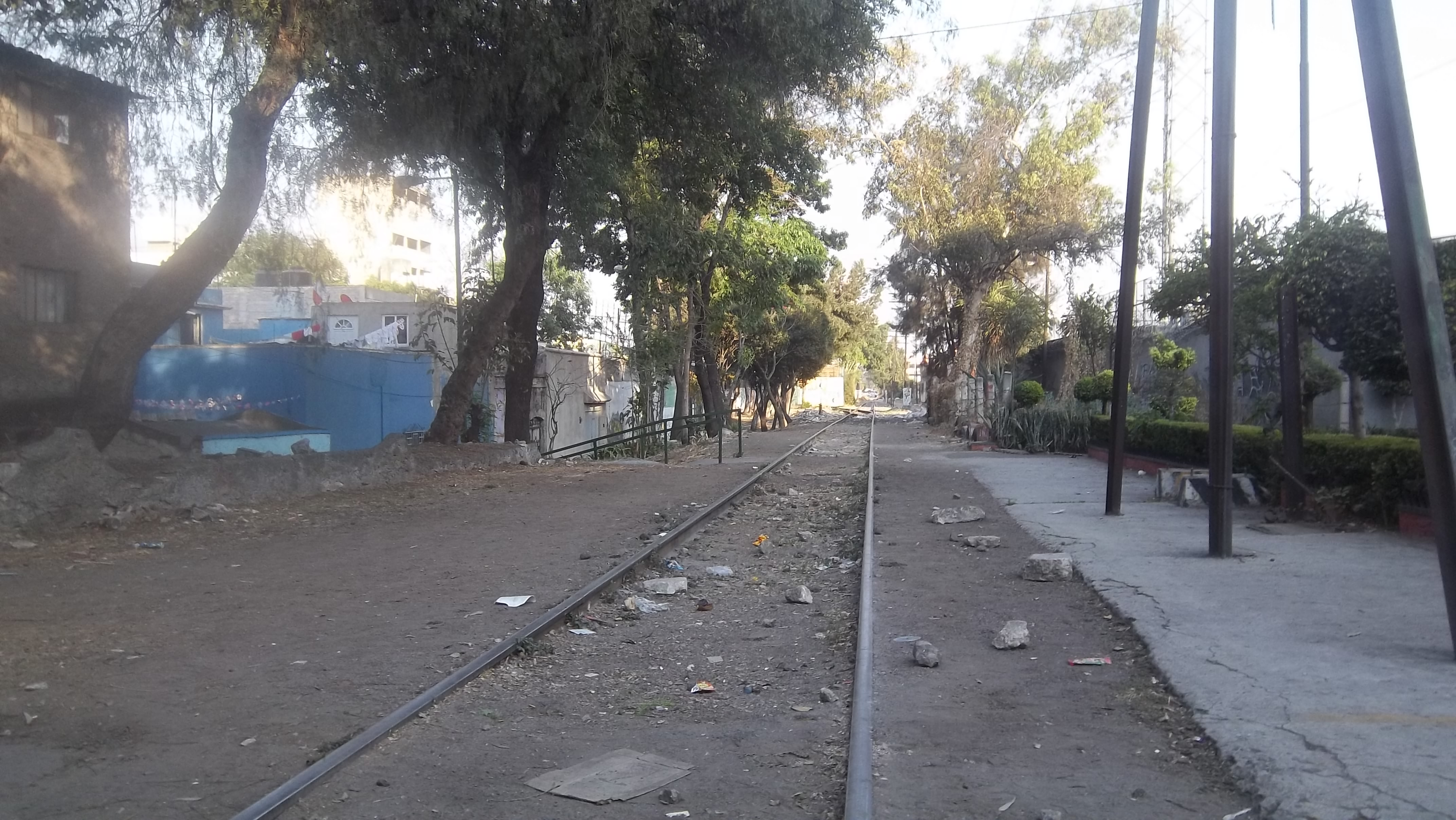
- Old railway at Colonia Atlampa

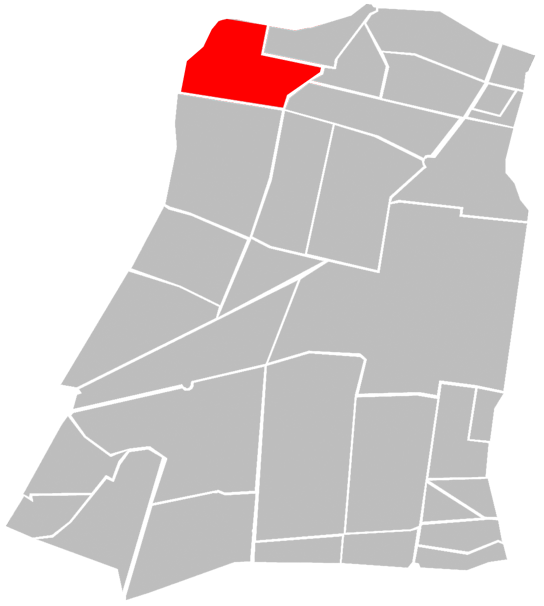
- Location of Colonia Atlampa (in red) within Cuauhtémoc borough
- Country: Mexico
- City: Mexico City
- Borough: Cuauhtémoc

Population (2010)
  - Total: 14,433
- Postal code: 06450

Colonia Atlampa is a colonia or neighborhood located in the Cuauhtémoc borough, northwest of the historic center of Mexico City. The boundaries of the area are marked by the following streets: Calzada de Nonoalco or Ricardo Flores Magón Street to the south, Circuito Interior Paseo de las Jacarandas to the north, Avenida Insurgentes Norte to the east and Circuito Interior Instituto Politécnico Industrial to the west. The neighborhood is considered lower class and working class. The name is derived from a Nahuatl phrase meaning "where the water divides."

== Description ==
The colonia extends over about 144 hectares and 45 blocks with 78 inhabitants per hectare. There are just over 2000 housing units, but many of these are tenements, and illegally built shacks. The area has problems with crime, garbage, wide scale unemployment and broken family units. Many live in shacks made of cardboard and other found materials. A large number of these are concentrated in four areas, near the rail line between Mexico City and Cuernavaca. There is one primary school, Dr. Héctor Pérez Martínez, meaning that many secondary and other school children must go to neighboring Colonia Guerrero and other places for their education.

Atlampa ranks 15th in crime in the borough, and is located next to a number of other high-crime colonias such as Colonia Peralvillo, Tepito, Unidad Habitacional Nonoalco-Tlatelolco and Colonia Guerrero. The most serious crime problem is gangs of youths from 12 to 25, mostly involved in street drug sales and robbery of buses, pedestrians and businesses. One activity is the robbery of buses through the area by youth who use fake guns to threaten passengers. While this is a fairly common occurrence in the north of the city, one particular hotspot for this crime is the intersection of Eje 2 Norte Eulalia Guzman and Circuito Interior in this colonia.

== History ==
In the pre-Hispanic period, the Azcapotzalco and Tlalnepantla Rivers forked. At the end of the 19th century, the area was empty potreros or long mesas that lead towards nearby mountains. The first houses were built there around 1880, constructed by a company called FF.CC. Central Mexicano. Railroad tracks eventually crisscrossed the area, which led to a number of large factories nearby. The foundation of the area as a colonia is around 1930. Some of these railroad tracks, such as those that connect Mexico City to Cuernavaca, still exist.

Between 2005 and 2008, the Tren Suburbano, which connects downtown Mexico City with northern suburbs was built through the colonia. During construction of the tracks, local businesses lost foot traffic and business, many permanently. Construction of the train tracks have included metal walls to prevent pedestrian and other access to the tracks. This had forced many in the neighborhood to have longer local travel times, especially as there are complaints about the safety of the pedestrian bridges. The train tracks pass by on Eje 2 Manuel González, dividing the colonia into two sections. This has made direct access to many places on the other side impossible. Pedestrian bridges tend to be high, and are accessible only to those who can climb the stairs.
