= Colonia Esperanza, Cuauhtémoc =

Neighborhood in Mexico City

Coordinates: 19°25′11.17″N 99°7′42.53″W

Colonia Esperanza is a small colonia or neighborhood located in the Cuauhtémoc borough of Mexico City just southeast of the historic center. Its borders are defined by the following streets: Lorenzo Boturini to the south, Fray Servando Teresa de Mier to the north, Calzada de la Viga Canal to the east and Francisco Javier Clavijero to the west.

Today it is an almostly completely residential neighborhood, but there is little known about its history. The Canal de la Viga passed through with a major bridge called Puente de Pipis located here, but over the years this canal dried up and the bridge disappeared. Around 1913, a company called Agricola y Colonizadora Mexicana began to subdivide and sell the land here for houses.

The area has one small park called Jardín Casimiro Chovell, and one preschool called Jardin de Niños Happy Kids on Topacio Street.
