= Colonia Maza =

Human settlement in Mexico

Coordinates: 19°27′18.94″N 99°7′38.05″W

Colonia Maza is a colonia or official neighborhood in the Cuauhtémoc borough just north of the historic center of Mexico City. The colonia’s borders are marked by the following streets: Calle Hierro, Eje 1 Oriente and Avenida FF.CC. Hidalgo to the north, Calzada de Guadalupe to the west and Calle de Acero to the south.

The origin of the colonia dates back to 1894, when José Maza, owner of the La Vaquita Ranch, petitioned to subdivide the land he held across from the Ferrocarril Hidalgo (Hidalgo Railroad) station. The proposed colonia was larger than the current Colonia Maza. The economic heart of the area was the railroad, which was constructed in 1881 and connected Mexico City with Pachuca, Tulancingo, Puebla and the Ometusco Hacienda in Hidalgo state. There was also a customs stations designed to control the entrance of pulque into Mexico City from Hidalgo.

Today, this railroad has merged with the Ferrocarriles Nacionales de México and this station disappeared by the 1960s, when the new station at Buenavista was constructed. Today, the station area is occupied by the “Viana y Cia” store. The colonia became smaller as Colonia Felipe Pescador split from Colonia Maza in the mid 20th century.

The area, like many others in Mexico City, is prone to flooding, especially during the rainy season in the summer and fall. The most recent severe flooding occurred in July 2010, along with several other colonias in the Cuauhtemoc borough.
