= Colonia Felipe Pescador =

Neighborhood in Mexico City

Coordinates: 19°27′14.21″N 99°7′38.05″W

Colonia Felipe Pescador is a colonia or neighborhood of the Cuauhtémoc borough of Mexico City. It is located at the northern end of the borough, north of the historic center of the city. The boundaries of the colonia are marked by the following streets: Eje 1 Oriente, Avenida Ferrocarril and Calzada de Guadalupe to the west, Eje 1 Boleo on the east, Calle de Hierro to the north and Eje 2 Norte Canal del Norte to the south.

The area used to be part of Colonia Maza before it separated. It occupies lands that were the station and yards of the Ferrocarriles Nacionales de Mexico. In 1945, these lands were ceded by the company to a workers’ group in order to build housing.

The colonia began as a low income and marginalized suburb of the city and eventually became working class. Much of landholders here did not hold official titles until relatively recently, due to efforts by Concepción Chon Castillo and Jesús Corona.

The colonial is named after Felipe Pescador (1879-1929) who was a telegraph operator and train dispatcher who promoted the nationalization of the rail system in Mexico. His advocacy was also behind the creation of a railroad workers’ union. He was also a writer, publishing a book titled “La Deuda Ferrocarrilera, los intereses de la Nación y la labor de los ministros de Hacienda”. His name is inscribed in the official hall of the Congress of the state of Durango, where he was from.
