= Centro Urbano Benito Juárez =

Apartment complex in Mexico City, Mexico

Coordinates: 19°24′34.82″N 99°9′26.97″W

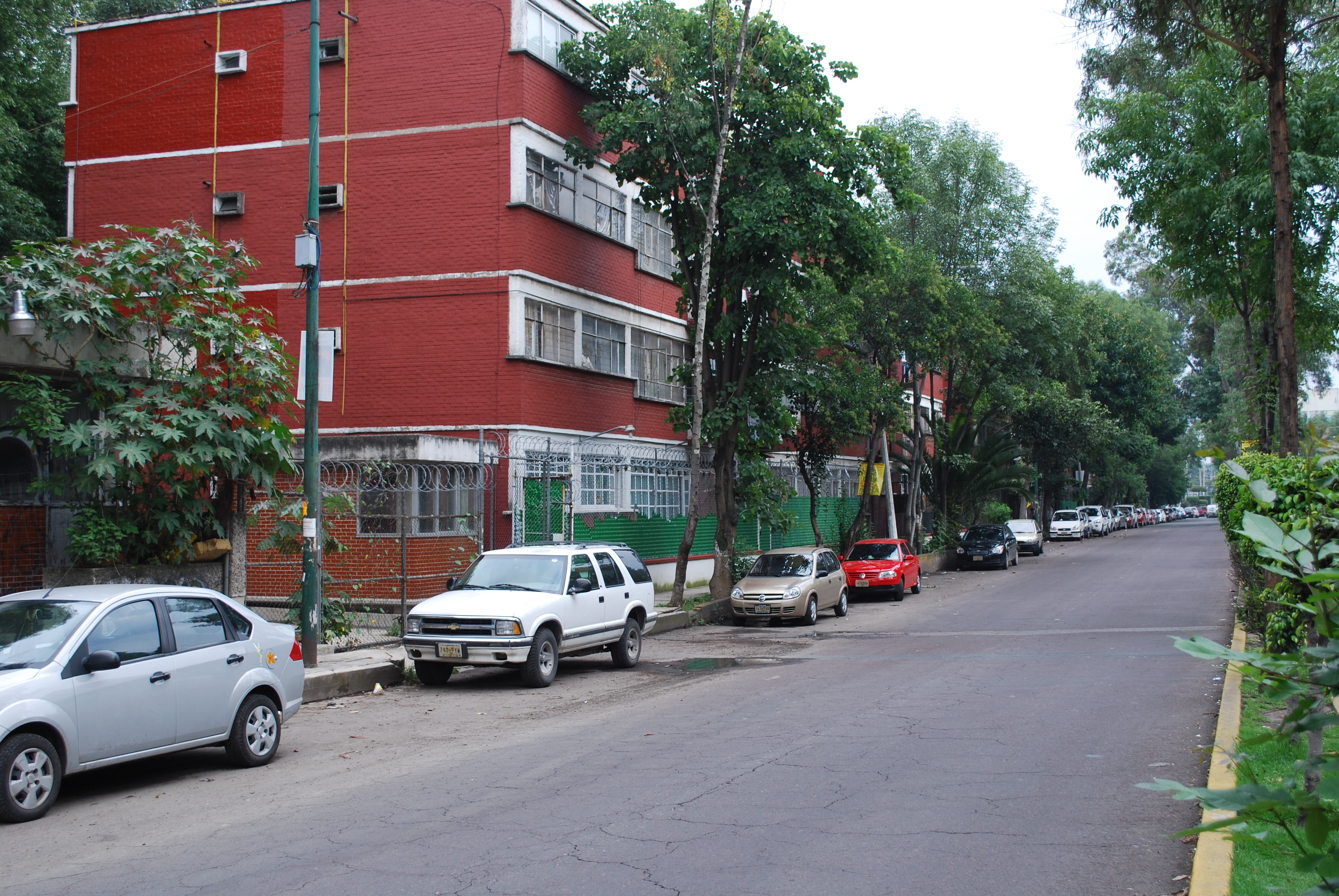
One of the remaining apartment buildings on Orizaba Street

The Centro Urbano Benito Juárez, more commonly called the Multifamiliar Juárez, was a large apartment complex built on the southeast section of Colonia Roma, Mexico City in the late 1940s and early 1950s. It was one of several projects of this type by architect Mario Pani, designed to be semi-autonomous and incorporate as much outdoors space as possible. It also featured one of the largest mural works of the 20th century by artist Carlos Mérida. Most of the complex, and the mural work with it, were destroyed by the 1985 Mexico City earthquake and the demolition of many of the damaged buildings. Only a few of the original buildings still remain. Despite this, the Cuauhtémoc borough in which it is located still lists it as a separate colonia or neighborhood.

== Planning and construction ==
The land was the site of the former Estadio Nacional, which was built in 1924 to serve not only as a sports stadium but as a political venue as well. Presidents Plutarco Elías Calles, Emilio Portes Gil and Lázaro Cárdenas all took their oaths of office here. The stadium was mostly abandoned by the end of the 1940s, as most of its functions moved to the Ciudad Deportiva. Pensiones Civiles, a government agency, acquired the land, which is bordered by Avenida Antonio M. Anza to the north, Huatabampo Street to the south, Avenida Cuauhtémoc to the east, and Jalapa Street to the west, in an area known as Colonia Roma. This area also included the La Piedad city park, providing for already open space.

In the mid 20th century, the Mexican government was building "centros urbanos" or planned urban communities in various parts of the city. These communities contained their own administration, businesses, recreational areas and schools, as well as health and other services. These were planned to be semiautonomous units, usually located near a Metro station. Architect Mario Pani was behind this complex and several others. Prior, he created the Centro Urbano Miguel Alemán (commonly called the Multifamiliar Alemán) in the late 1940s, as an experiment in providing low cost housing. Its success prompted the commission of the Centro Urbano Benito Juárez by Mexican President Miguel Alemán Valdés to house government employees and their families. With this project, Pani and his associate Enrique del Moral looked to improve upon the stark lines of the Alemán project. Pani's work on this and other projects paralleled that of French architect Le Corbusier, using the latter's principles such as location, mobility, architectural aesthetics, history and more. These projects would make Pani the most important Mexican architect of the 20th century. The complex was inaugurated on 10 September 1952, the day of President Alemán's sixth report to Congress.

== Description of the original complex ==
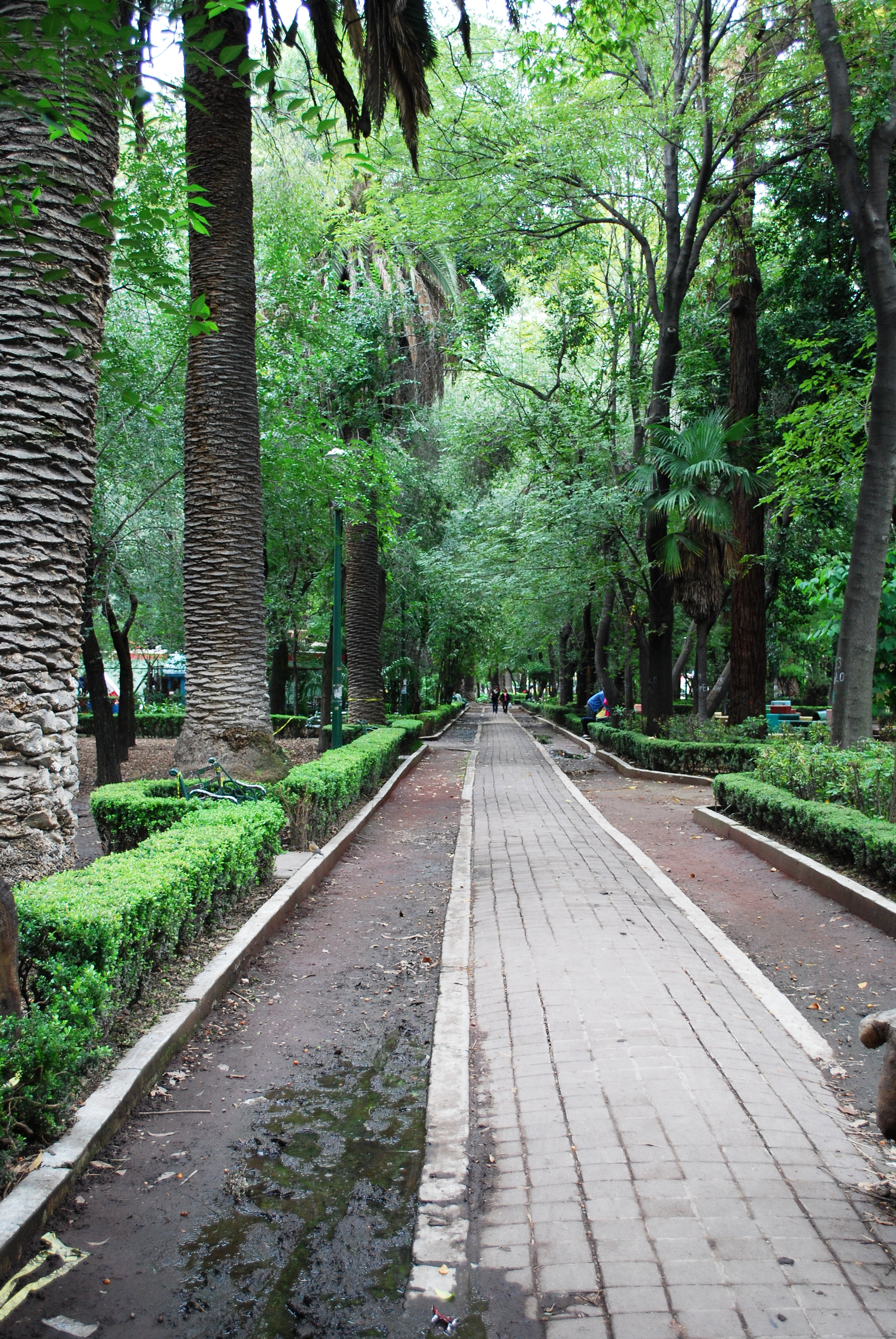
Path in a green area within the complex's borders

The original complex covered an area of 250,000 square meters. However, construction surface at the ground level only covered 16,000, leaving 80 percent of the grounds free for parks and sports areas. It contained nineteen buildings of various heights, between three and nineteen floors. These buildings contained a total of 984 apartments of twelve different types to accommodate between 3,000 and 5,000 people. The buildings had four types, labeled "A" (largest) "B", "C" and "D", with a total apartment floor space of 700,000 square feet. At the Alemán complex, the buildings zigzag over the site, but in the Juárez complex, the buildings were placed at angles to give a greater sense of privacy and to provide the apartments with as much natural light as possible. There were no vehicular roads within the complex to allow pedestrians to walk around. All of the vehicular roads that entered terminated at a parking lot before one entered the area where the apartment buildings were located. There was only one road that passed through the complex, Orizaba Street, but this road was lowered below ground level, the first time this was done in Mexico City. Pani placed four of the "C" type buildings right alongside this underpass to free even more space between the buildings for park and recreational space. About 2,500 trees were planted at the site. These emphasis on space reduced Le Corbusier's recommendation of 1,000 residents per hectare to 240, and would make this the least densely populated of his apartment projects. The apartments were split into two levels, with the kitchen and living room on one floor and the bedrooms above or below. In this way, elevators only had to stop at every third floor. All apartment and elevator access was through open passages. Within the apartments, open space was created by eliminating walls between the living and dining rooms, which was popular in the United States starting in the 1950s and 1960s. Tenants disposed of garbage though chutes to the basement, a novel idea in Mexico at that time.

== Integration of artwork ==
The complex was one of the largest projects in the world which integrates artwork into the architecture. Carlos Mérida's mural work here was the most important of his career and the largest mural project in Mexico in the 20th century until the completion of David Alfaro Siqueiros's The March of Humanity mural cycle at the Polyforum Cultural Siqueiros. Mérida received the commission in 1951, which took him three years. The murals covered an area of 4,000 m^{2}. The goal of Mérida's work was to fuse it into the building, rather than just use it as a canvas. The complex then became an example of "plastic integration" where the architecture and the art work with each other and neither detracts from the other. This project would become the most sophisticated realization of the concept in the post World War I period.

The Guatemalan-born artist sculpted and painted images of pre-Hispanic legends from Mexico. However, the native depicted in these stories have decidedly European faces. This mixing of native dress with European faces reflects what is called "Mestizo Art" and reflects the then Mexican government's social ideology of promoting the "mestizo" (mixed native European heritage) as Mexico's identity.

One example of the integration of architecture and art were the panels of the "C" buildings. These panels were created when Pani decided to push the closets to outside of the main walls to save interior floor space This created protruding half boxes distributed over the exterior walls’ surfaces. Mérida used these as canvases to place images. Another example is the underpass walls along Orizaba Street. Mérida realized that motorists did not have time to contemplate peripheral images, so he placed elongated anthropomorphic figures which preceded and anticipated the forward motion of the cars.

The most intricate work was done on the taller "B" buildings, which had ten floors and 72 apartments each. Residents primarily used the interior elevators but outside staircases were placed and decorated with murals. On these staircases, Mérida depicted four central Mexican and one Mayan legends, The Story of Texcoco, the Legend of the Fifth Sun, the Sacrifice of Ixlolxóchitl, the Destruction of Tula and the Popol Vuh. Each legend was depicted with a series of figures nearly eight feet tall each, which tell the story in frames as one ascends the stairs. The figures were chipped from the concrete in bas-relief then painted.

Pani's and Mérida's work received mixed reviews, which often reflected the rivalry "Contemporáneo" school of art, and the more politicized Mexican traditional muralist movement. There was also reluctance to accept Mérida's work as "Mexican" as he remained a Guatemalan citizen his entire life. One example of this mixed message was from Siqueiros, who initially praised the "plastic integration" concept but then condemned both the art and the architecture as "bourgeois", poorly done and representing a return to the pre Mexican Revolution Porfiiran era.

While Siquieros criticized Mérida's work as something attractive for tourists, in the following decades it would be Siquieros' work at the Ciudad Universitaria that would draw tourists, leaving the work at the apartment complex forgotten.

== 1985 earthquake ==
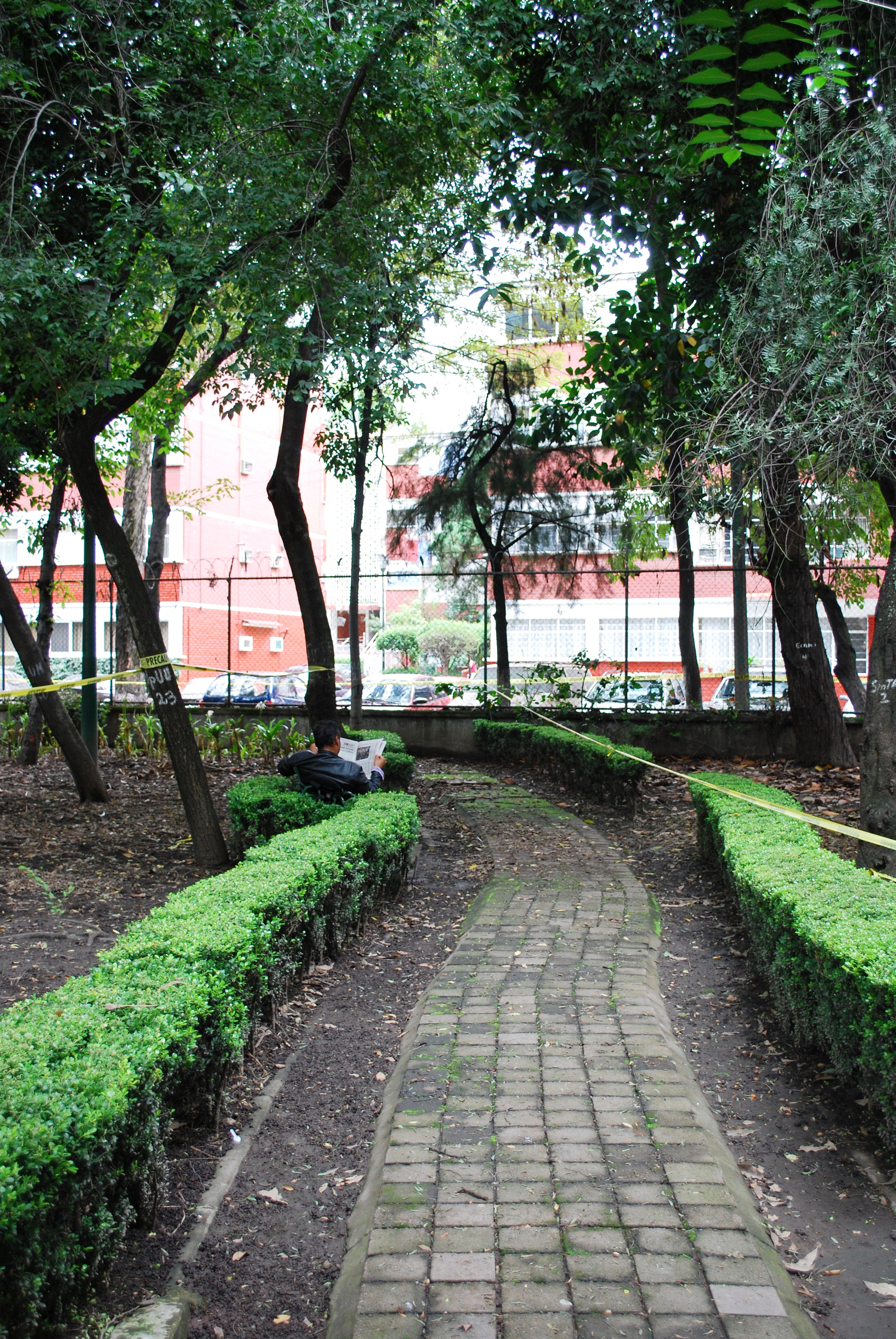
Path in complex area cut off from apartment buildings by a fence

Before construction began, Pani had engineers test the ground, and it was declared solid. For this reason, the concrete structures of the complex were never reinforced. The building survived a number of major, but less severe quakes than the one in 1985, and little was known about how earthquakes affect superstructures in the 1950s. However, one earthquake, in 1957, did damage several buildings and led to their condemnation.

The real destruction occurred during the 1985 Mexico City earthquake, thirty three years after the complex was finished. This earthquake severely damaged the Colonia Roma section of the city, leaving many buildings in ruins. Buildings A1, B2 and C3 of the Multifamiliar Juárez complex partially collapsed, and a number of residents died.

Many of the buildings could have been saved, but it proved uneconomical to do so. Pensiones Civiles erred when they created the rental contracts with tenants by neglecting to add a clause allowing them to raise rents. By 1985, there were tenants paying as little as 200 pesos a month for rent. (US$25 in 1950, $.10USD in 1985). For this reason, maintenance of the buildings and grounds suffered until it became impossible. The government decided that this was the time to condemn nearly all of the buildings, with only several still remaining. The earthquake essentially made the complex disappear.

The destruction of the buildings destroyed nearly all of the mural work. Evidence of these remain in photographs and the preliminary sketches, which Mérida donated to the National Autonomous University of Mexico (UNAM). One student of Mérida's Alfonso Soto Soria, used some of the original designed to create a monument to the work done at the Juárez complex. This can be found at an apartment complex called Fuentes Brotantes.

Like other planned urban communities of the mid 20th century, what remains of the Conjunto Urbano Benito Juárez has continued to deteriorate. There are problems with lack of parking, crowded streets, abandoned units and crime. Much of the land on which the destroyed structures were built has not been redeveloped.
