= Alessandra Rojo de la Vega =

Mexican politician and activist

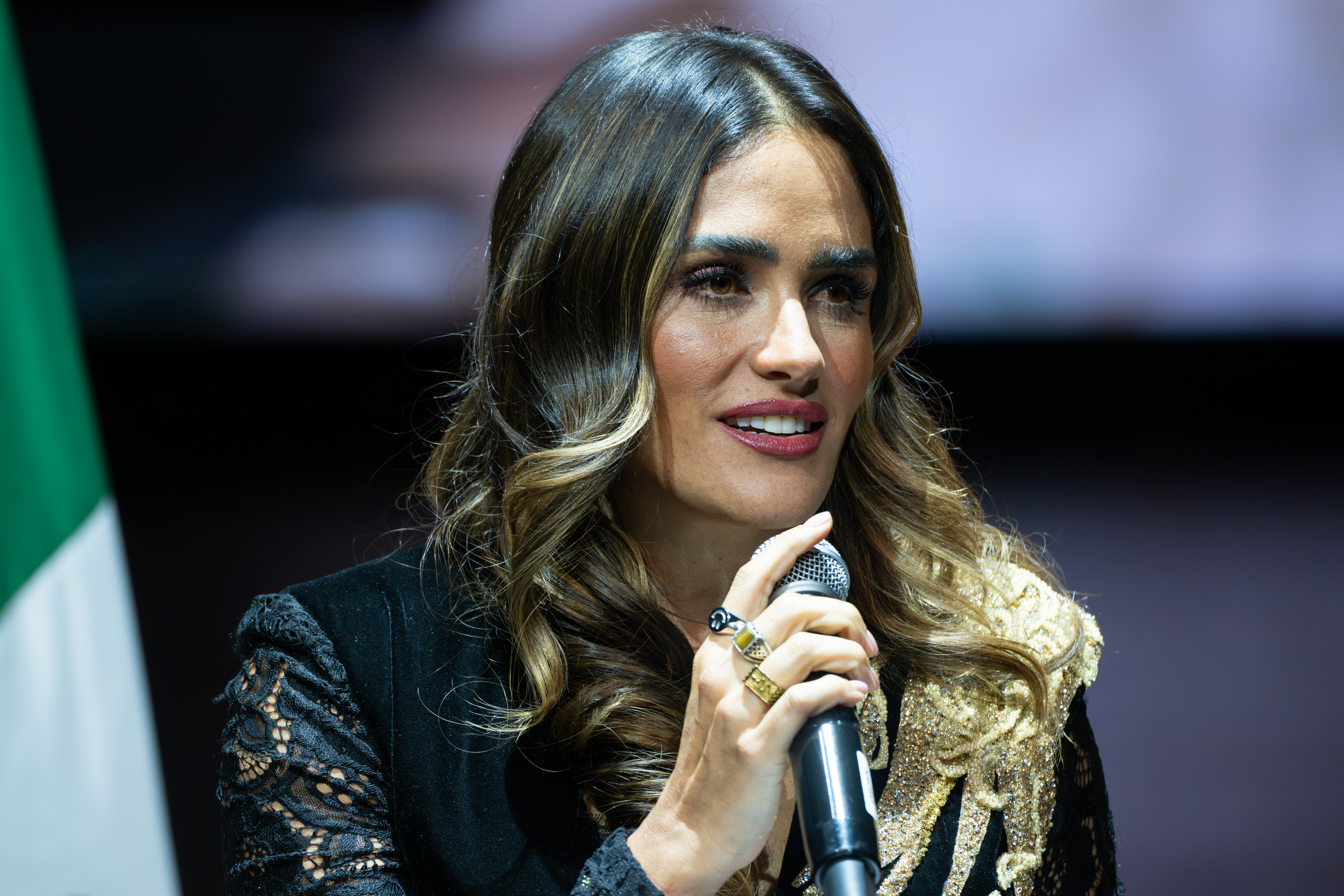
- Rojo de la Vega in 2026

Mayor of Cuauhtémoc, Mexico City
- Incumbent
- Assumed office 2 October 2024
- Preceded by: Raúl Ortega Rodríguez

Deputy in the Congress of Mexico City
- In office 17 September 2018 – 31 August 2021

Personal details
- Born: 16 January 1986 (age 40) Mexico City, Mexico
- Party: Va por México (as mayor); Ecologist Green Party (as deputy)
- Spouse: Emmanuel Gray (m. 2014; div. 2022)
- Children: 3
- Occupation: Politician

Alessandra Rojo de la Vega Piccolo (born 16 January 1986) is a Mexican politician, activist, businesswoman, and influencer. In 2024, she was elected the mayor of the borough of Cuauhtémoc in Mexico City after a contested election. Previously, she was a member of the Congress of Mexico City for the Ecologist Green Party of Mexico (PVEM) from 2018 to 2021.

== Early life and education ==
Rojo de la Vega was born on 16 January 1986 in Mexico City. Rojo de la Vega obtained a bachelor's degree in communication science from the Universidad Iberoamericana, and a law degree from the Universidad Jurídica del Sureste.

== Activism ==
Rojo de la Vega founded United Movement for Childhood (Movimiento Unido por la Infancia, MUI México) in 2014, a non-profit organization focused on helping protect and develop children and teenagers in Mexico. Among other projects, MUI México worked with children and teenagers in The Lost City of Tacubaya, a shantytown with a high crime rate in Mexico City. She was also President of No es una somos todas AC ("It's not one, it's all of us"), an organization dedicated to fighting gender violence. In 2022 she was interviewed by Carolina Rosario from ¡Despierta América!, where she talked about gender violence against women in Mexico.

== Political career ==
Rojo de la Vega started her career in politics as part of the social communications team in the State of Mexico and in 2012 for President Enrique Peña Nieto. She was the director of Social Development in the Miguel Hidalgo borough, and a local deputy for the Ecologist Green Party of Mexico (PVEM) in the Mexico City Congress from 2018 to 2021.

=== Election for mayor of Cuauhtémoc ===
On 31 January 2024 Alito Moreno announced on X that Rojo de la Vega would be the candidate for the PRI-PAN-PRD Coalition (Va por México) for mayor of the Cuauhtémoc borough in Mexico City.

On the night of 11 May 2024 five gunshots were fired at Rojo de la Vega's parked vehicle. The attack was captured in CCTV footage and the assailant was later captured, who alleged he had been paid to "give a scare" to the candidate.

Rojo de la Vega won the election of 2 June 2024 by a difference between 11,000 and 12,000 votes, but the results were contested by Catalina "Caty" Monreal, the candidate from Morena. Monreal alleged irregularities in at least 532 polling centers and demanded a full recount of all the votes. However, on 20 July the regional court of the Electoral Tribunal denied generalized irregularities and only authorized a limited recount of 73 polling centers, which was carried out and did not alter the election result.

Caty Monreal submitted another request for nullification of the election, alleging political gender violence as well as violations of the spending rules by Rojo de la Vega's campaign. Monreal claimed that political gender violence was done against her when Rojo de la Vega said that she was a puppet candidate imposed by her father, Ricardo Monreal, a prominent Morena politician and former mayor of Cuauhtémoc. Rojo de la Vega denied this, saying that referring to Monreal by her last name, and pointing out her and her family's corruption did not constitute political gender violence. During the campaign for Cuauhtémoc it was reported that a company partially owned by Caty Monreal had received numerous contracts from the state of Zacatecas, governed by her uncle, David Monreal.

On 18 September 2024 Rojo de la Vega was confirmed as the winner by the Federal Electoral Tribunal. She was sworn in as mayor of Cuauhtémoc on 1 October 2024.

=== Mayor of Cuauhtémoc (2024–present) ===
Rojo de la Vega presented a work plan based on six main groups named as follows: "Women at the forefront", "Cuauhtémoc builds peace", "Green Cuauhtémoc", "Warm and reliable government", "Prosperity for everybody", and "Rights for everybody". After moving into the mayor's office she found two hidden devices that allegedly were planted for the purpose of spying on her. In November 2024, at a meeting with the budget committee of the Mexico City Congress, Rojo de la Vega denounced irregularities and potential acts of corruption during the previous administrations of Sandra Cuevas and Raúl Ortega.

In late January 2025, Rojo de la Vega lodged a criminal complaint with the public prosecution service after receiving a series of death threats via social media.

== Personal life ==
Rojo de la Vega is the daughter of businessman Martín Rojo de la Vega and Mónica Piccolo. Her siblings are fitness influencers Nunzia and Gabriel Rojo de la Vega. In February 2014 she married architect Emmanuel Gray, with whom she had three children: Martinah, and twins Lucah and Milah. She and Gray divorced in 2022.
