= Colonia Ex Hipódromo de Peralvillo =

Neighborhood in Mexico City

- Colonia of Mexico City
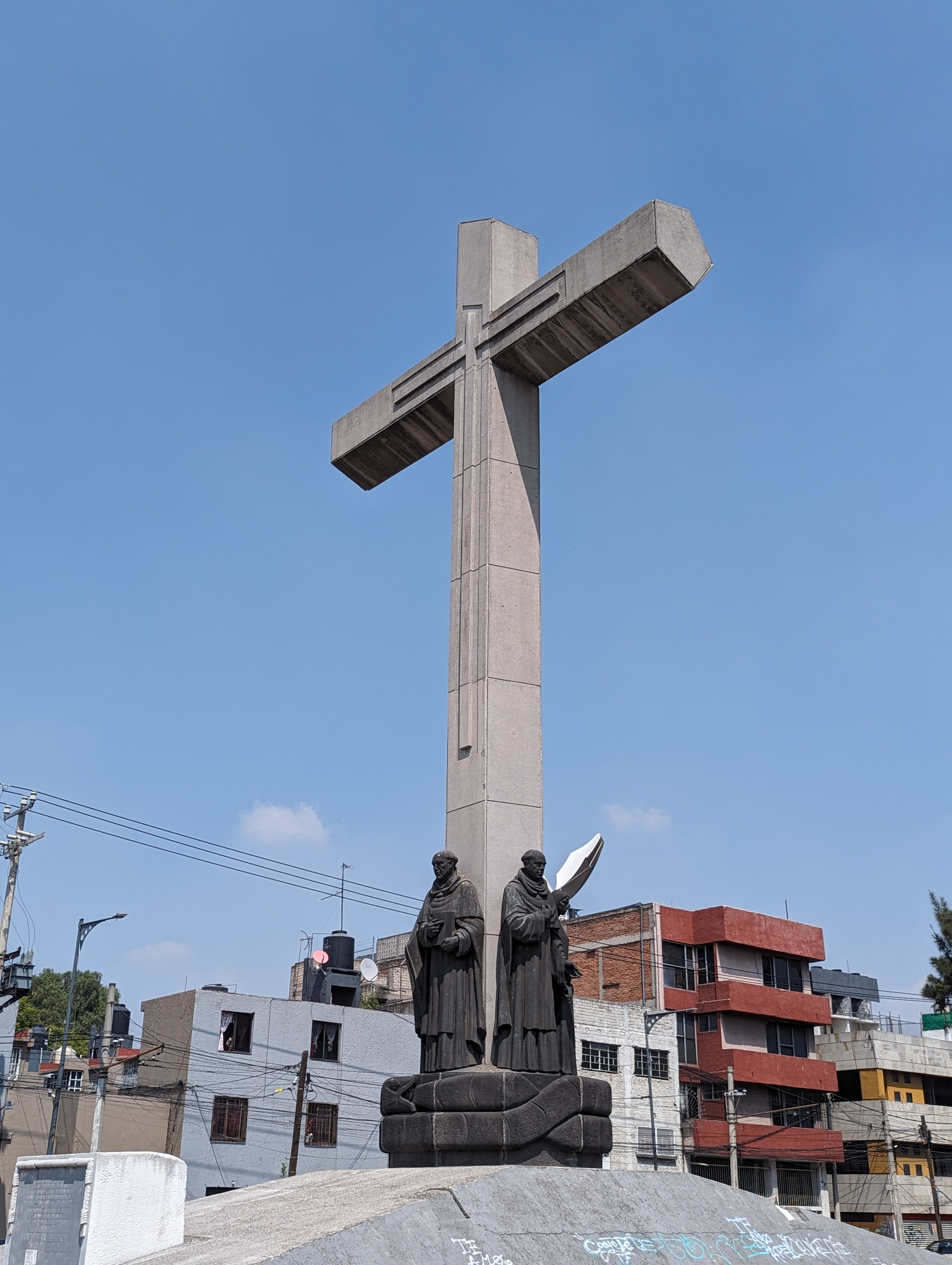
- Monument to the pilgrims

- Location within Mexico City
- Country: Mexico
- City: Mexico City
- Borough: Cuauhtémoc

Population (2010)
  - Total: 12,000

Colonia Ex Hipódromo del Peralvillo is a colonia or neighborhood of the Cuauhtémoc borough of Mexico City, located north of the historic center. It is part of an area of the city that is noted for crime and lower income residents. One area of the colonia around Calzado de la Ronda is noted for stored selling used auto parts, frequently from stolen cars. The colonia is named after an old horse race track (hipodromo in Spanish) that was built here in the early 20th century, but the area was later parceled and sold to create housing for lower class workers.

== Description ==
The colonia's borders are marked by the following streets: Juventino Rosas to the north, Manuel Gonzales to the south, Calzada de Guadalupe to the east and Lerdo Street and Calzada del Vallejo to the west. To the north of it is Colonia Peravillo, but both colonias are often referred to together as Peravillo.

The colonia is located in the northern part of the borough, an area that has been lower class and has had problems with crime since the 20th century. It borders colonias and neighborhoods such as Tepito, Unidad Habitacional Nonoalco-Tlatelolco and Colonia Guerrero, which all have reputations as high-crime areas.

The area around Calzada de la Ronda is filled with stored selling mostly used auto parts as well as informal mechanics. This has caused problems for neighbors who complain that the businesses block sidewalks and streets with merchandise and cars under repair. The city has stepped in to enforce codes with success but neighbors complain that the problem reappears. Another problem is that a number of auto parts vendors are selling merchandise from stolen cars. Arrests have been made as recently as March 2010 when a sting operation went down in the colonia.

Private schools include Anayetzin (primary), Arco Iris (preschool), Colegio Citlalli Franco Ingles (primary), Jardín de Niños Bambi (preschool) and Rivet (preschool). Public schools include Cendi DIF 15 Juan Duque de Estrada, Centro de Atención Múltiple 85 M (special education), Centro de Atención Múltiple 85 V (special education), Centro de Atención Múltiple 87 M (special education), Estado de Sonora (primary), Estancia Jardín Infantil No. 15 DIF (preschool), Gabriel Leyva Solano (primary), Republica de Colombia (preschool) and Asaer VII-5 M (special education).

== History ==
The land in this area belonged to a ranch called Rancho de Vallejo during the colonial period. At the very beginning of the 20th century, in 1903, the federal government bought this ranch with the intention of creating a military installation here. However, soon after President Porfirio Díaz decided to turn much of it into a park and to install a horse track.

The track, called the Hipódromo de Peralvillo, was built with the cooperation of a horse group called the Jockey Club, which was base at the Casa de Azulejos. The track had a surface area of 419,856 m^{2}. The oval track measured 1,500 meters with 600 meters of this straight. The cost of the construction was 30,000 pesos. This was the first formal race track in Mexico City. Prior to that horse racing was performed on private lands such as in the Rancho de Nápoles in the San Lázaro area.

Regular seasons were held in the spring and fall with sporadic races at other times. The site also held other events such as entertainment spectacles which were often sponsored by German, French and military horse organizations as well as bicycle races and even the first automobile race in the city in 1903. The latter was organized by the German community in honor of the birthday of Emperor William II.

The track was dismantled in 1913, with associated buildings disappearing soon after. The track was located between Calzada de la Ronda and Calzada de los Misterios, were today are lines associated with the Ferrocarril Mexicano to the port of Veracruz.

In 1921 and 1922, the government ordered these lands parceled and sold in small parcels for residential purposes. This was during a time period when the political climate favored workers demands for living space. Under President Álvaro Obregón, orders were given to acquire and partition lands for use by lower class inhabitants. There is little information about the early residents of the area except that they did have a homeowners' association. These early residents bought their land in conjunction with the government, which gave them five years to pay off their debt. In return, the government installed services such as water and streets.
