= Colonia Peralvillo =

Coordinates: 19°27′40.5″N 99°7′58.9″W

Peralvillo
- Neighborhood of Mexico City
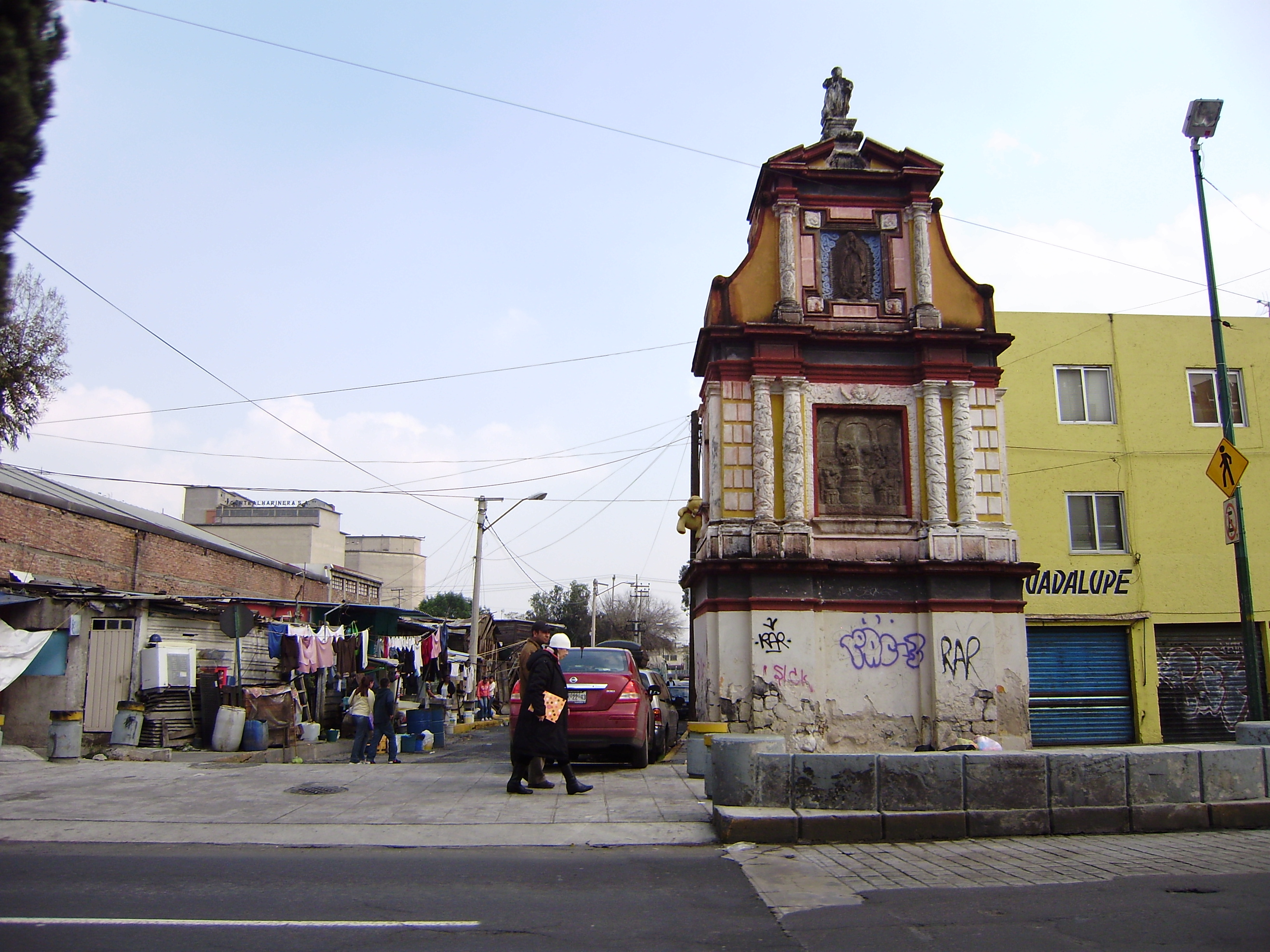
- Street scene off of Calzada de los Misterios in the colonia
- Interactive map of Peralvillo
- Country: Mexico
- City: Mexico City
- Borough: Cuauhtémoc

Population (2010)
  - Total: 20,213
- Postal code: 06220

Colonia Peralvillo is a colonia located in the Cuauhtémoc borough of Mexico City, just northwest of the city's historic center. It has been a poor area since colonial times, but the modern colonia was not established until the late 19th and early 20th centuries. Although the area has been the setting for a number of literary works and films, today the area is known for violence and crime, especially shootings and the selling of stolen auto parts.

== Description ==
The boundaries of the colonia are formed by the following streets: Juventino Rosas to the south, Avenida Río Consulado to the north, Calzada de Guadalupe to the east and Avenida Insurgentes Norte to the west. It has been a poor area since early colonial times. Many of the streets here are named for Mexican and international musicians, a change which was done early in the colonia's history to unify it. However, there are exceptions where the names are simply numbers or others such as Avenida Ferrocarril de Cintura. There are a total of 27 blocks. There are a number of private and public schools in the colonia such as 30 de Septiembre Primary (public), Carlos Darwin Primary (private), Cendi DIF Republica Española Technical School (public), Chris Pre school (private), Colegio Carolingio Primary (private), Estado de Michoacan Pre school (public), Galacion Gomez Pre school (public), La Patita Pre school (private), Leonardo Bravo Primary (public), Leopoldo Rio de la Loza Secondary (public), Lisandro Calderon Primary (public), Luces de Mexico Primary (private) and Luis de Camoens Secondary (public).

The area has a reputation for crime and has been the scene of a number of violent robberies and murders. In 2006, 25,000 pesos was robbed from a secondary school cooperative after a shootout with police in the streets of the colonia as the robbers tried to escape. In 2008, the third highest ranking police official in Mexico City, Hugo Moneda Range, was shot to death on the intersection of Calzada de los Misterios and Berlioz. In 2004, the Agencia Federal de Investigación, conducted raids in Peralvillo and other areas of the city to shut down establishments making illegal slot machines and illegally operating casinos. However, the major business in the area is the black market in autoparts. This business began in the late 1980s, when only twelve businesses selling used autoparts existed, and has expanded to over 9,000, with 90 to 95% of these selling stolen parts. Making Colonia Peralvillo and neighboring Colonia Hipodromo de Peralvillo one of the city's major areas for chop shops. However, genuine used auto parts, whether obtained illegally or not, are facing pressure from imitation parts made in Taiwan and other parts of Asia. This is making the stealing of automobiles less profitable.

An abandoned green area near where Paseo de la Reforma, Calzada Misterios and Eje 2 Norte converge was cleaned up and rehabilitated to become the site of a 3.8-meter tall statue of the wrestler El Santo, by sculptor Edwin Barrera. The statue was sponsored by the wrestler's son, who is known as the Hijo del Santo. It was placed here because the wrestler lived near here on Belisario Dominguez Street with his siblings to fight in the nearby Arena Coliseo in the city center.

== History ==
In the 16th century, the area was not part of Mexico City, but rather a geographic area known as the Llanos de Peralvillo (Plains of Peralvillo). It was an area with many inns and other services for travelers entering Mexico City from the north. It also had a customs gate called the Garita de Peralvillo. This colonia, along with neighboring Tepito, Lagunilla and Tlatelolco were areas mostly inhabited by indigenous and mestizos, both poor, as well as large haciendas and monasteries during the colonial period. Much of these lands, especially ecclesiastical lands, were expropriated by Benito Juárez in the latter 19th century and redistributed among the poor living here. The modern colonia began when Carlos David de Gheest petitioned to have his lands, now known as the San José or Los Cuartos de la Cuchilla del Fraile areas, subdivided into housing in 1889. In 1910, the Terrenos de Peralvillo Company did the same with two other lots of land, which completed the current perimeter of the colonia. The area has always been called Peralvillo but the origin of the name is not clear. One writer, Gonzalo Peredo Goméz states that the name comes from a passage in the work Don Quixote, but spelled "Perabillo," which referred to a place in La Mancha.

The area has been used as a setting in a number of literary works such La Marchanta by José Martínez de la Vega and screenplays by Juan García, who used the pseudonym "El Peralvillo." One film set here is Los Fernández de Peralvillo (1953), which won five Ariel Awards.

In 2000, residents of the colonia burned in effigy the three presidential candidates (Vicente Fox, Cuauhtémoc Cárdenas and Francisco Labastida) on Wagner Plaza. This was done after the three were ceremoniously convicted of using "the money of the people" for their presidential campaigns. This protest occurred during the annual ritual of the burning of a large cardboard and paper effigy of Judas Iscariot.

Started in the mid-2000s, the La Casa de Todos association operates a pizzeria and bakery that employs street children. These young people can often been seen in the colonia selling candy and other items in order to survive. The goal of the association is to give these young people steady employment and job skills. The operation is small, mostly selling to those in the colonia, but it hopes to get contracts to provide bread and other foods to hospitals and prisons.
