= Cuauhtémoc, Mexico City =

One of 16 boroughs of Mexico City

Cuauhtémoc
- Borough
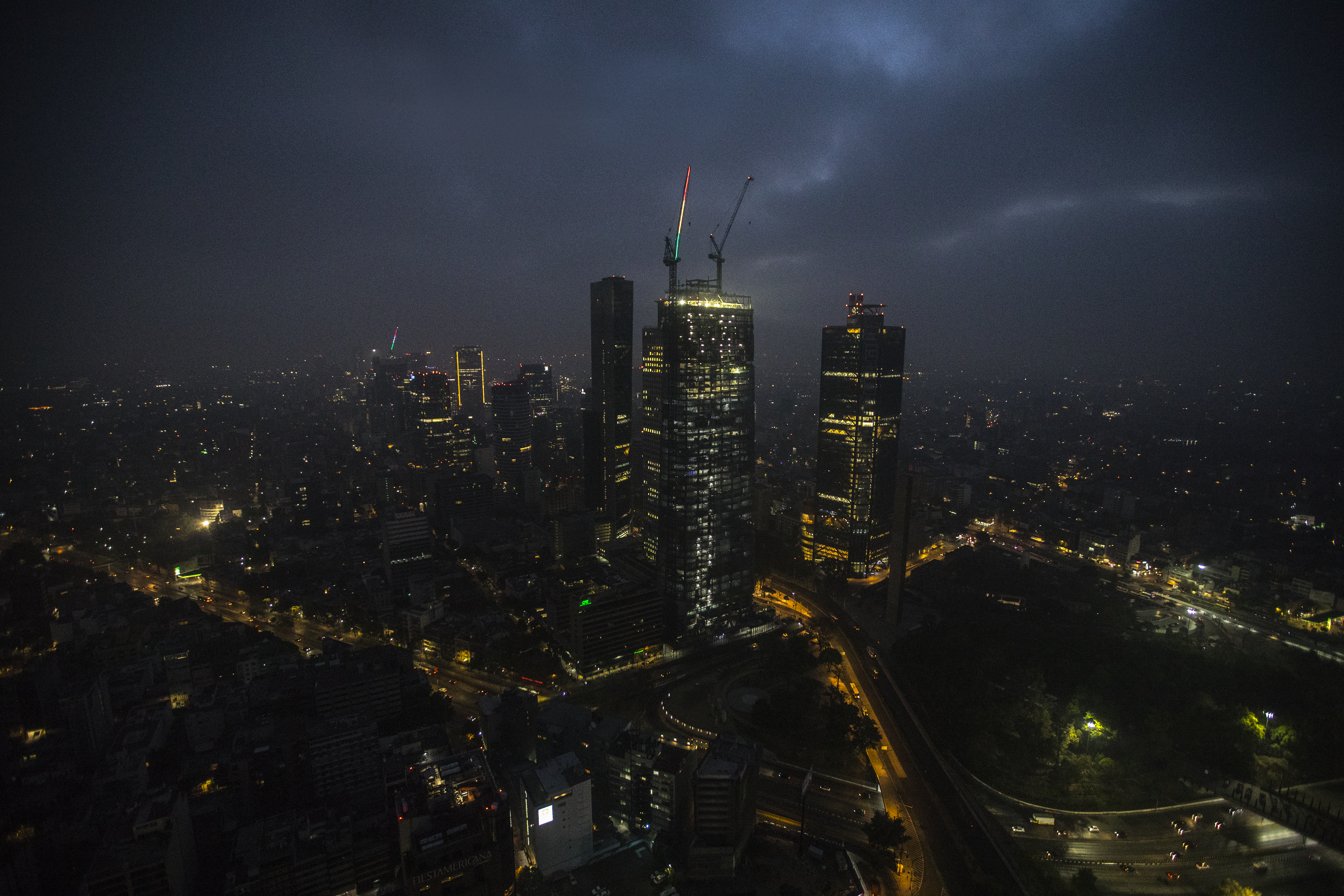
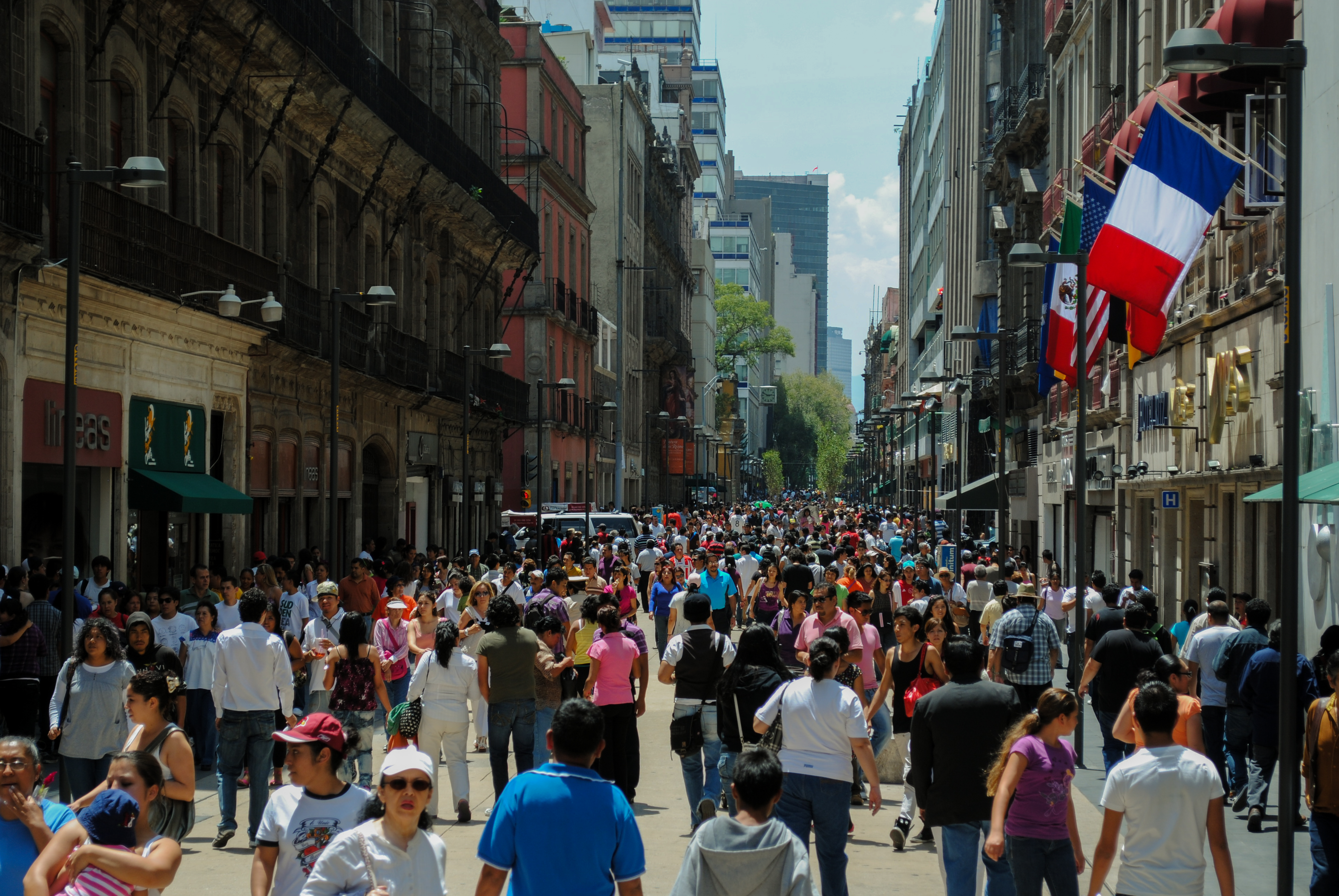
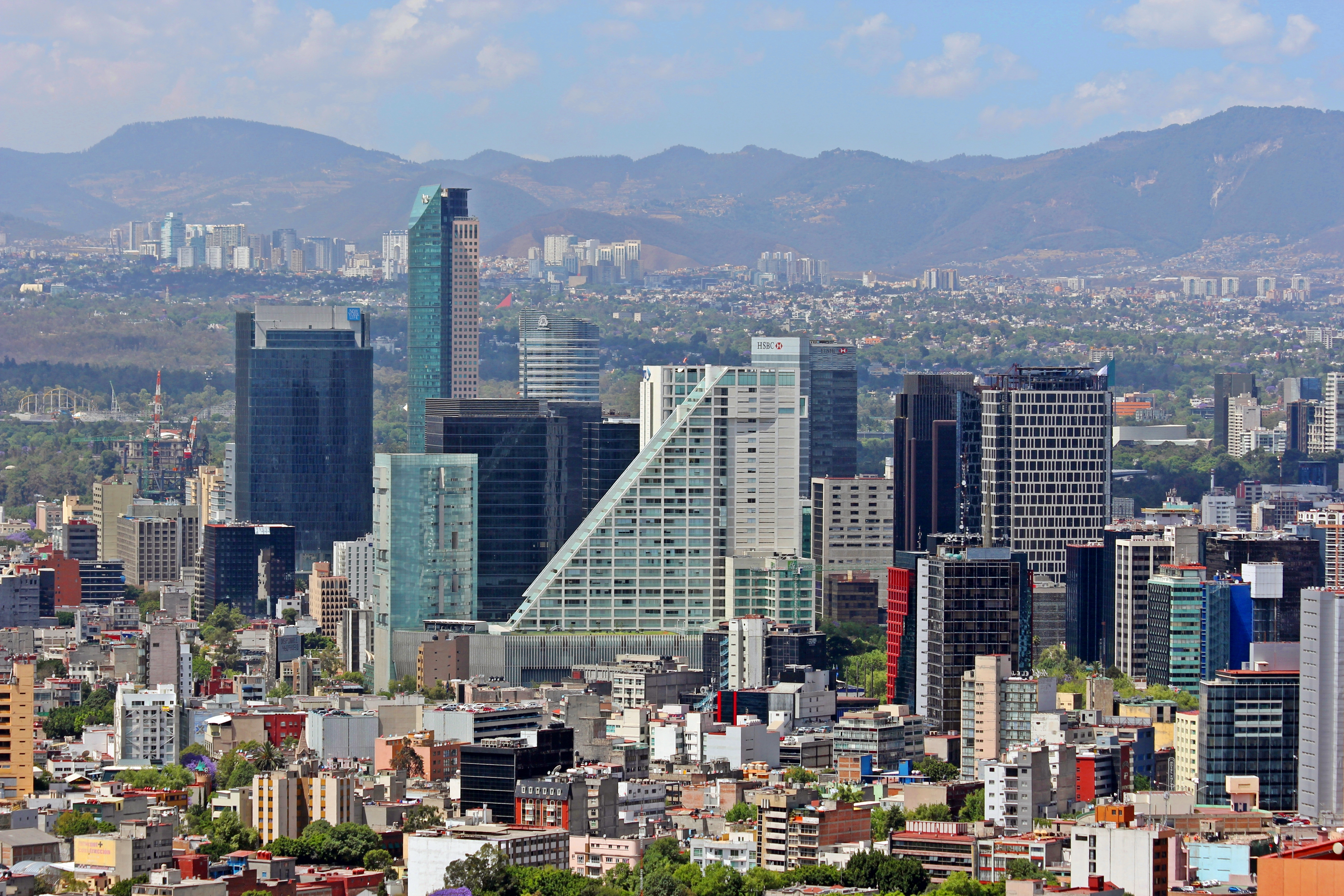
- CDMX at night, Madero street and Buildings on Paseo de la Reforma

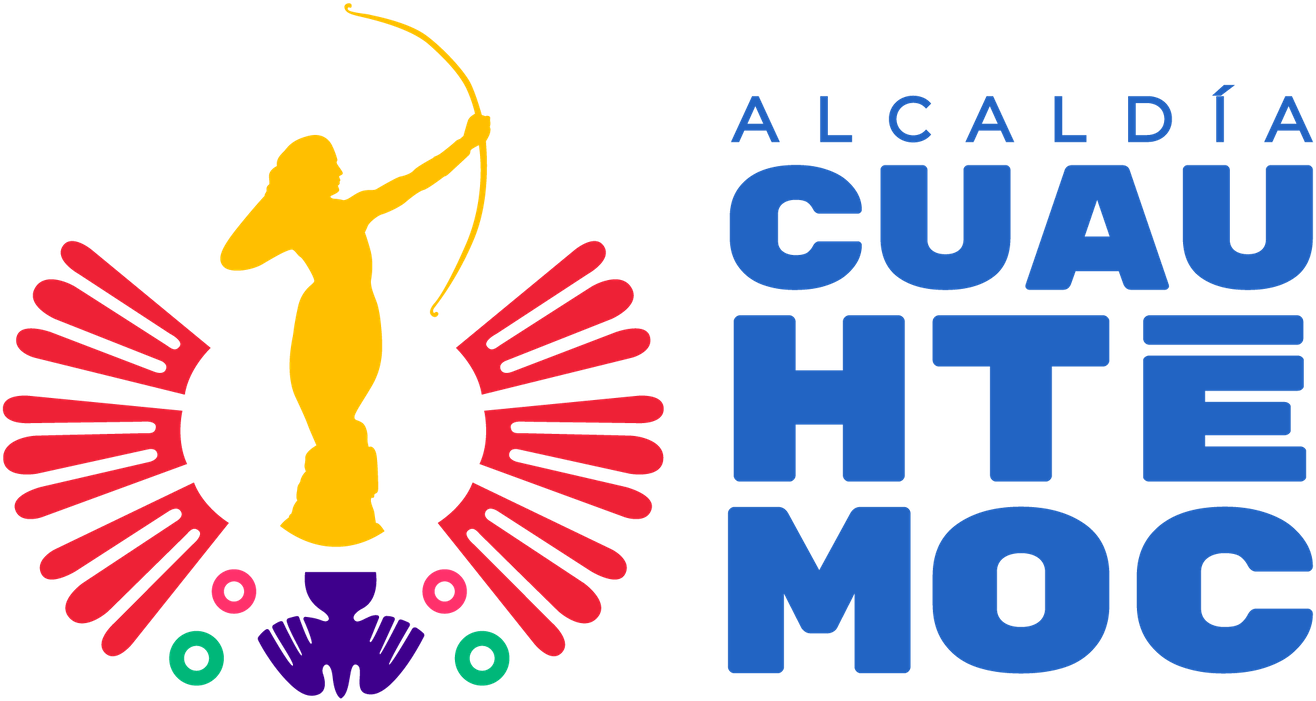
- Seal Logo

- Cuauhtémoc within Mexico City
- Coordinates: 19°26′35″N 99°08′40″W
- Country: Mexico
- Federal entity: Mexico City
- Established: December 29, 1970
- Named for: Cuauhtémoc
- Seat: Aldama y Mina s/n Colonia Buenavista, Cuauhtémoc 06350

Government
  - Mayor: Alessandra Rojo de la Vega (PRI)
  - Federal electoral districts: CDMX-02 & CDMX-12

Area
  - Total: 32.44 km^{2} (12.53 sq mi)
- Elevation: 2,244 m (7,362 ft)

Population (2020)
  - Total: 545,884
  - Rank: 6th in Mexico City
  - Density: 16,830/km^{2} (43,580/sq mi)
- Time zone: UTC-6 (Zona Centro)
- Postal codes: 06000–06995
- Area code: 55
- Website: alcaldiacuauhtemoc.mx

Cuauhtémoc (Spanish pronunciation: [kwawˈtemok]) is a borough of Mexico City. Named after the 16th-century Aztec ruler Cuauhtémoc, it contains the oldest parts of the city, extending over what was the entire urban core of Mexico City in the 1920s.

Cuauhtémoc is the historic and cultural center of Mexico City, although it is not the geographical center. While it ranks only sixth in population, it generates about a third of the entire city's GDP, mostly through commerce and services. It is home to the Mexican Stock Exchange, the important tourist attractions of the historic center and Zona Rosa, and various skyscrapers, such as the Torre Mayor and the Mexican headquarters of HSBC. It also contains numerous museums, libraries, government offices, markets, and other commercial centers, which can bring in as many as 5 million people each day to work, shop, or visit cultural sites.

This area has had problems with urban decay, especially in the historic center. Efforts to revitalize the historic center and some other areas have been going on since the 1990s, by both government and private entities. Such efforts have resulted in better public parks, such as the Alameda Central, which was renovated, and the modification of streets such as 16 de Septiembre and Madero that have become car-free for pedestrians (zona peatonal).

== Description ==
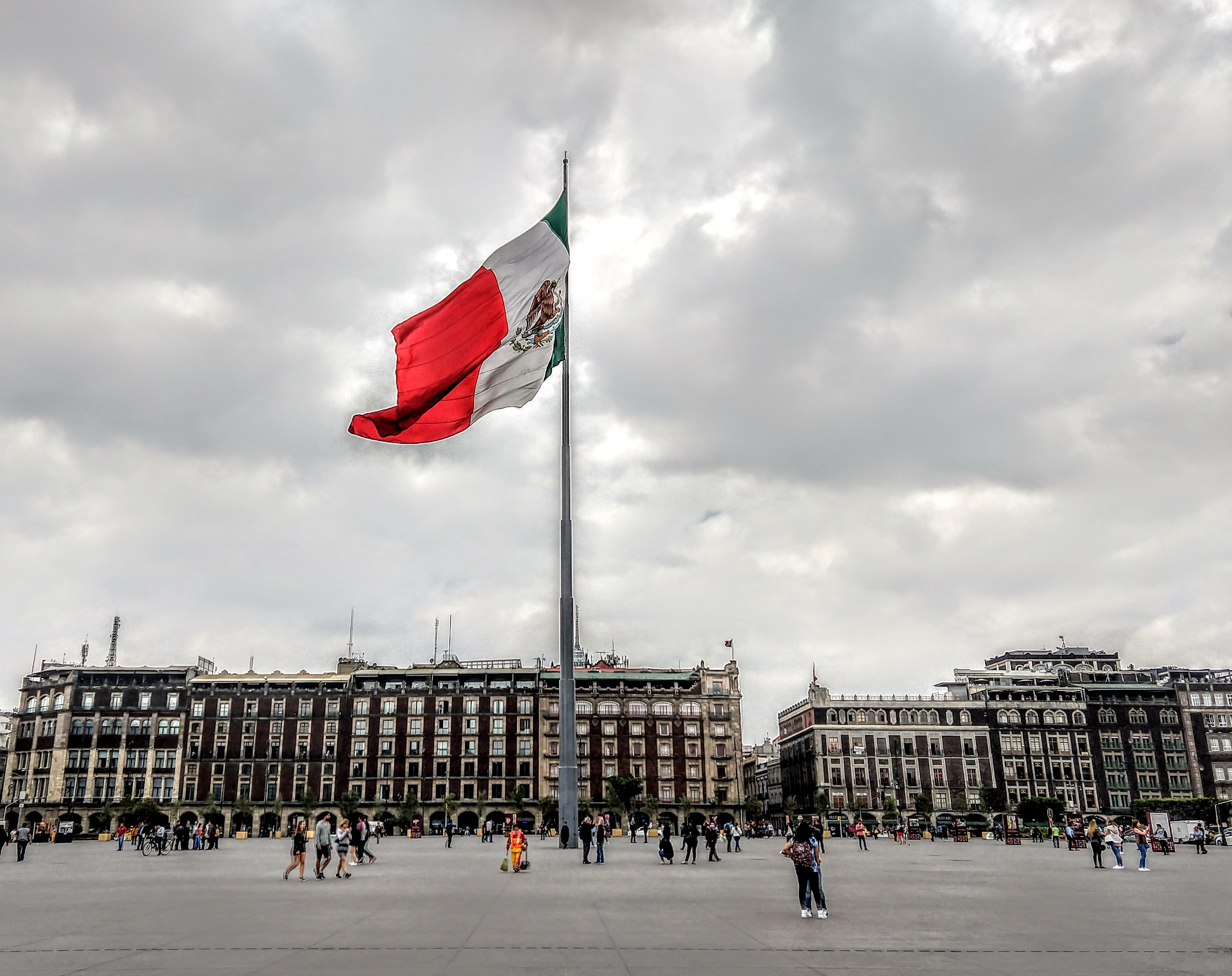
View of the Zocalo

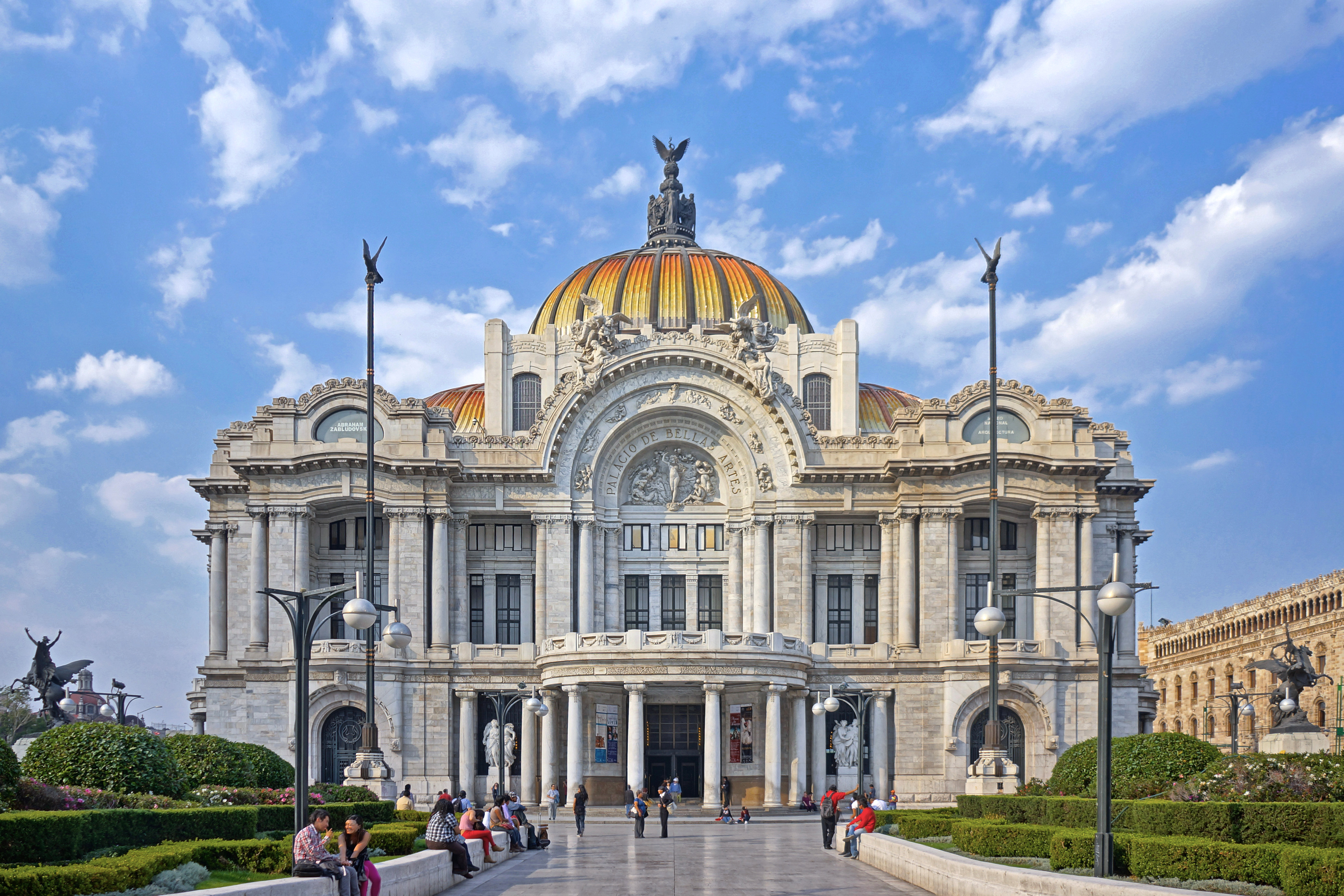
Palace of Fine Arts

Cuauhtémoc is centered on the Zócalo or main square, which contains the Aztec ruins of the Templo Mayor, the Metropolitan Cathedral, and the National Palace of Mexico. The borough covers 32.44 km^{2}, divided into 34 colonias, 2,627 city blocks, 1,267,000 m^{2} of green areas, 1,500 buildings classified as national monuments, two archeological zones (Tlatelolco and Templo Mayor), 1,290 private buildings with official historic value (valor patrimonial de propiedad privada), 210 public buildings with official historic value, 120 government buildings, and two major planned-housing complexes (Unidad Habitacional Nonoalco-Tlatelolco and Centro Urbano Benito Juárez). In addition, the borough contains 43 museums, 23 clock towers, 150 public and private libraries, 24 centers for infant development, six cultural centers sponsored by the borough, 38 publicly sponsored markets with 14,434 vendors, 25 stage theaters, 123 movie theaters and 9 public sports complexes.

The sports facilities include Deportivo Cuauhtémoc in Colonia Buenavista, Deportivo José María Morelos y Pavón in Colonia Morelos, Deportivo Peñoles in Colonia Valle Gómez, Deportivo Guelatao in Colonia Centro, Deportivo Tepito in Colonia Morelos, Deportivo Antonio Caso in Tlatelolco, Deportivo Francisco Javier Mina in Colonia Guerrero, Deportivo Estado de Tabasco in Colonia Exhipódromo de Peralvillo and Deportivo Cinco de Mayo in Tlatelolco. A new center called the Deportivo Bicentennario has been started in Colonia Buenos Aires. The area has 264 public and private preschools, 116 middle schools, 102 technical and regular high schools, and 13 teachers' colleges.

Because it is the oldest part of Mexico City, with buildings that are centuries old, deterioration is an ongoing concern. Currently, at least 789 inhabited buildings in 12 colonias have been listed as in danger of condemnation, due to structural damage caused by sinking into muddy soil of the former lakebed. These are mostly located in the historic center and the colonias immediately surrounding it. Some of these have been classified as having historic or artistic value by the Instituto Nacional de Bellas Artes or Instituto Nacional de Antropología e Historia. This has been a problem for the area for centuries and has involved famous structures such as the Metropolitan Cathedral, which had major foundation work done to stop the damage caused by uneven sinking.

A large part of this borough is divided between commercial zones and historic and cultural sites. While the borough does not have the highest crime rate in the city, with 13.9% of all Mexico City crime committed here, it was, as of 2007, considered to be fairly dangerous because of its urbanization and because most of the people found in the borough are there only to work or visit. In some older neighborhoods, people live and raise children along with street vending, squatting, and takeover of public spaces by drug addicts, drug dealers, and prostitutes. As of 2007, seven of the borough's 34 colonias had at one point been ranked in the top 10 most lawless in the city by the secretary of public safety of Mexico City, with a few, such as Tepito, gaining infamy for being so. Some of these rundown areas were lower class colonias such as Colonia Guerrero and Colonia Morelos, but similar problems were also found in upper middle class colonias such as the northern part of Colonia Roma. The most common crimes were muggings, with 1.47 reports per day, robbery of businesses with .78 reports per day, and car theft with .71 reports per day.

Most of the 5 million who come into this borough each day are there to work, visit the area's markets, shops, and cultural attractions, or are tourists. The borough is the most visited area of the city by tourists, who mostly come to see the historic center and Zona Rosa. People from other parts of the city come to visit the museums and large public markets such as La Lagunilla, Mixcalco, Hidalgo, Medellín, and San Juan. The influx brings in 800,000 vehicles to circulate its streets each day, with traffic jams, especially in and near the historic center nearly a daily occurrence.

=== Demographics ===
While it is the most important borough economically, bringing millions of people into its territory on any given day, its population of 545,884 in 2020 ranks only sixth out of the city's 16 boroughs. This population has been steadily decreasing even as the population of the rest of the city has remained static, although a slight increase occurred in the last 10 years. A fairly large percentage of the population is over 60 years of age and over half of the residents are either single or living with a partner. The borough contains only seven percent of all housing units in the city.

Those who do live here are mostly employed in services (57.5%) and commerce (23.4%).

=== Government ===
The borough was first established on December 30, 1970, after the circumscription of Mexico City was split into four boroughs. Before the political reforms of 2016, it was governed by a borough chief (jefe delegacional)) and a cabinet consisting of a secretaria particular, coordinacion de asesores, dirección interinstitucional y de fomento economico, subdirección técnica, subdirección de comunicación social, and subdirección de unidades habitacionales. After becoming an alcaldía, the head of government became a mayor.

The seat of the borough government is located in Colonia Buenavista.

=== Colonias ===
These are the colonias and neighborhoods in Cuauhtémoc:

Colonia Centro • Colonia Doctores • Colonia Obrera • Tepito • Colonia Algarín • Colonia Ampliación Asturias • Colonia Asturias • Colonia Atlampa • Colonia Buenavista • Colonia Buenos Aires • Centro Urbano Benito Juárez • Colonia Condesa • Colonia Cuauhtémoc • Colonia Esperanza • Colonia Exhipódromo de Peralvillo • Colonia Felipe Pescador • Colonia Guerrero • Colonia Hipódromo • Colonia Hipódromo Condesa • Colonia Juárez • Colonia Maza • Colonia Morelos • Colonia Paulino Navarro • Colonia Peralvillo • Colonia Roma • Colonia San Rafael • Colonia San Simón Tolnahuac • Colonia Santa María Insurgentes • Colonia Santa María la Ribera • Unidad Habitacional Nonoalco-Tlatelolco • Colonia Tabacalera • Colonia Tránsito • Colonia Valle Gómez • Colonia Vista Alegre • Zona Rosa

== History ==
=== Tenochtitlan ===
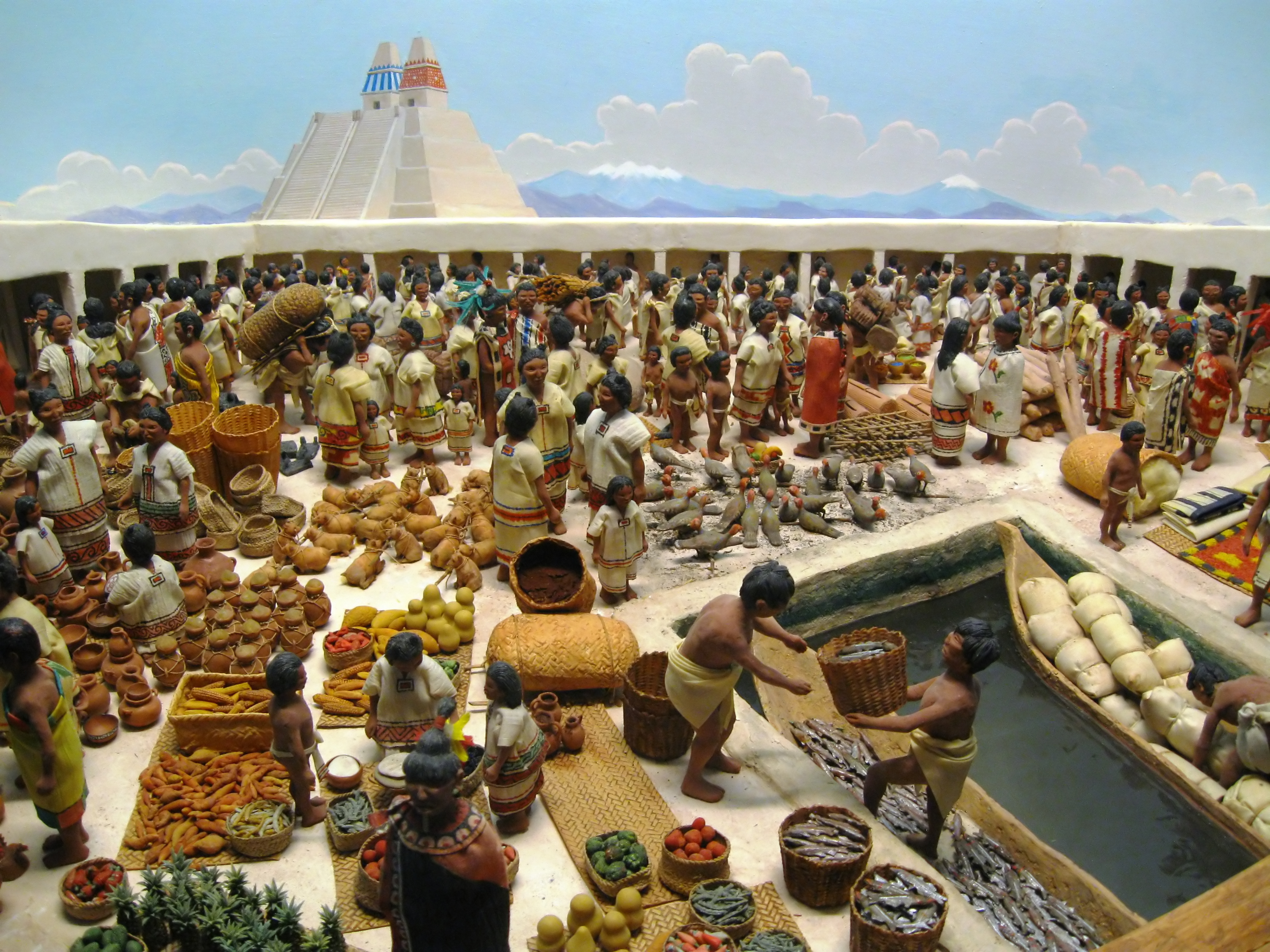
Model of the marketplace of Tlatelolco with the Templo Mayor in the background

The early history of the delegation coincides with the history of Aztec Tenochtitlan and colonial Mexico City. Tenochitlan was founded on a marshy island in Lake Texcoco. It was divided into four capuillis or neighborhoods centering on the Templo Mayor. This temple's ruins are located very close to the modern main square or Zocalo today.

=== Spanish rule ===
When the Spanish conquered Tenochtitlan in 1521, they destroyed most of the old Aztec public buildings, but kept the basic layout of the city, which roughly extends over what is now known as the historic center or Colonia Centro. The cathedral was built over a portion of the sacred precinct (teocalli) of the destroyed Templo Mayor, the National Palace was built over Moctezuma's New Palace, and the Zocalo was built over what was an open space near the sacred temple space. Over the early colonial period, European-style construction replaced Aztec ones over the entire island city, with the most important public buildings concentrated on the blocks adjoining the Zocalo.

As the center of New Spain, the city held the greatest prestige, prompting those who had made their fortunes through conquest, mining, commerce, and other means to have homes in the city, as close to the Zocalo as possible. The city soon became filled with mansions, large churches and monasteries, and monumental public buildings, which would eventually earn it the nickname of "City of Palaces".

At the beginning of the 19th century, this city remained mostly within what is now called the historic center, although various drainage projects had been enlarging the island. The city proper contained 397 streets and alleys, 12 bridges, 78 plazas, 14 parish churches, 41 monasteries, 10 colleges, seven hospitals, a poorhouse, a cigar factory, 19 restaurants, two inns, 28 corrals for horses, and two official neighborhoods.

=== Independence era ===
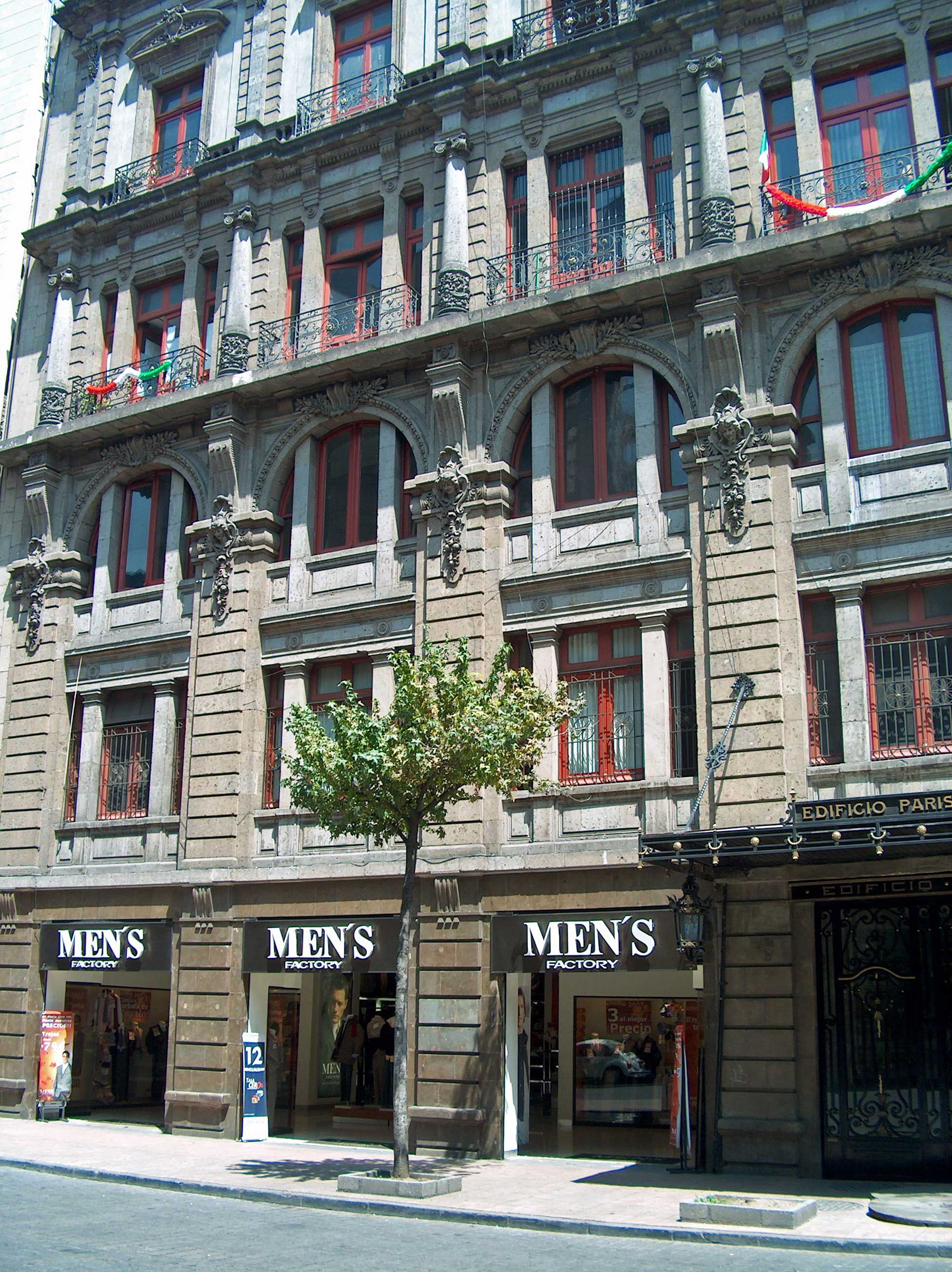
19th Century Porfirian architecture in Colonia Roma.

After Mexico gained its independence in 1824, Mexico City was designated as the capital of the new country, and the city and its surrounding area (11.5 km^{2}) were incorporated as a "Federal District," separate from the other states. By the late, 19th century, the city began to break its traditional confines with the construction of new neighborhoods, called colonias, in the still-drying lakebed. This was especially true in the areas west of the historic area, with the creation of "modern" colonias for the wealthy along the Paseo de la Reforma, built earlier by Maximilian I. These colonias include Colonia Juárez, Colonia Roma, Colonia Cuauhtémoc, and Colonia San Rafael. Colonias for poorer and working-class people were built mostly north and south of the city such as Colonia Morelos, and Colonia Doctores.

=== 20th century ===
In 1928, President Álvaro Obregón divided the rapidly growing Federal District area into 13 boroughs (delegaciones), with what was then the city proper designated as the Cuauhtémoc borough. While the borough still remained the center of city's commerce, politics, academia, and culture during the first half of the 20th century, this historic center began going into decline, as the wealthy moved out into the new western colonias as early as the end of 19th century. By the 1950s, the country's main university, UNAM, moved almost all of its facilities out of the borough and into the newly built Ciudad Universitaria in the south of the city. In the 1940s, the city government froze rents in the borough, and by the late 1990s, when this was finally repealed, many tenants were paying the same prices they were in the 1950s. With no financial incentive to keep up their properties, landlords let their buildings disintegrate. Most of this occurred in the historic center, but this phenomenon also presented itself in other areas, such as Colonia San Rafael and the Centro Urbano Benito Juárez, as well.

Since the 1950s, the city has received the highest number of migrants from other parts of Mexico. Most of these come from very rural areas of the country, and a significant percentage speak an indigenous language with Spanish as a second language, or do not speak Spanish at all. As of 2005, seven percent of the borough's population is made up of these migrants, who have put strains on services such as education.

=== 1985 Earthquake ===
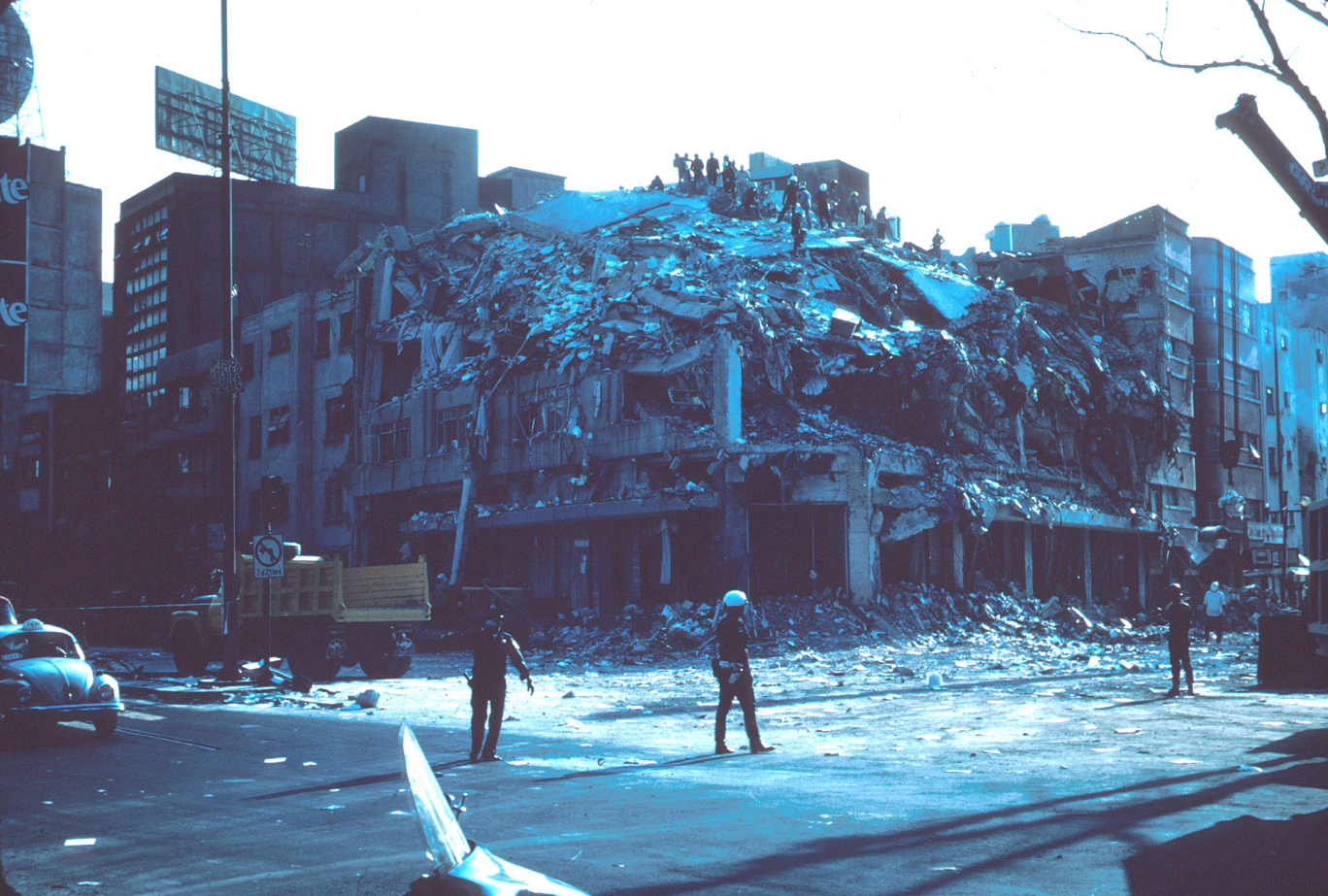
Earthquake damage in 1985

The borough was the hardest hit by the 1985 earthquake with 258 buildings completely crumbled, 143 partially collapsed, and 181 seriously damaged. The result was the loss of 100,000 residents, just in the historic center. Another area with major damage was Colonia Roma with a number of buildings collapsing completely. Even areas that did not suffer significant damage, such as Colonia San Rafael, were affected when homeless from other parts of the borough moved in, or Colonia Condesa, when wealthier residents moved out. Because of the rent situation, most of the damaged structures were never fixed or rebuilt, leading to slums or garbage-strewn vacant lots. As late as the 2000s, buildings damaged from the event have collapsed. In 2003, the city government expropriated 64 properties thought to be in danger of sudden collapse due to damage suffered nearly 20 years earlier after a collapse of an apartment building in Colonia Vista Alegre, but in 2010, an apartment building partially collapsed in Colonia San Rafael, due to the same cause. Since the quake, the borough has invested in its own early warning system, which was created for it by UNAM.

Between the flight of wealthier residents from the historic center and the colonias that immediately surround it, and the damage from the 1985 earthquake, parts of the borough became deserted at night. Former mansions had been converted into tenements for the poor, and the sidewalks and streets were taken over by pickpockets and street vendors, especially in the historic center. This made the area undesirable for tourists. As the historic center is the city's main tourist attraction, the city lost its standing as a destination for international visitors, instead becoming an airport connection for other areas of the country. Until recently, many of the restaurants of the area, even the best, would close early to allow employees time to get home because the area was not particularly safe at night.

=== Contemporary events ===
Starting in the late 1990s, the city and federal governments, along with some private associations, have worked to revitalize the borough, especially the historic center. Starting in the early 2000s, the government infused 500 million pesos (US$55 million) into the Historic Center Trust and entered into a partnership with a business group led by Carlos Slim, to buy dozens of centuries-old buildings and other real estate to rehabilitate. Work has concentrated on renovating historic buildings, repaving streets, and improving water, lighting and other infrastructure. A number of the oldest streets near the Zocalo have been made pedestrian-only and most street vendors have been forced to move out of the historic center. This paved the way for the opening of upscale eateries, bars, and fashionable stores. Also, young people are moving into downtown lofts. To attract more tourists, new red double-decker buses are now in use. Other efforts have been made in other parts of the borough, such as in Colonia Juarez and Colonia Obrera, but with mixed results.

This has not resolved all of the borough's problems, though. Many of the problems with urban decay (abandoned buildings, squatters, uncontrolled street vending, crime, etc.) continue. The continued migration of people into the area from rural parts of Mexico has increased illiteracy rates, in addition to poorer areas, where dropout rates are high. The borough government has been accused of corruption by the Cámara de Comercio, Servicios y Turismo (Chamber of Commerce, Services and Tourism), especially in the issuance of business permits with exorbitant fees and fines. Most of the problem is with small torilla operations, paper stores. and small grocery stores. which operate completely at the discretion of borough agents.

== Economy ==
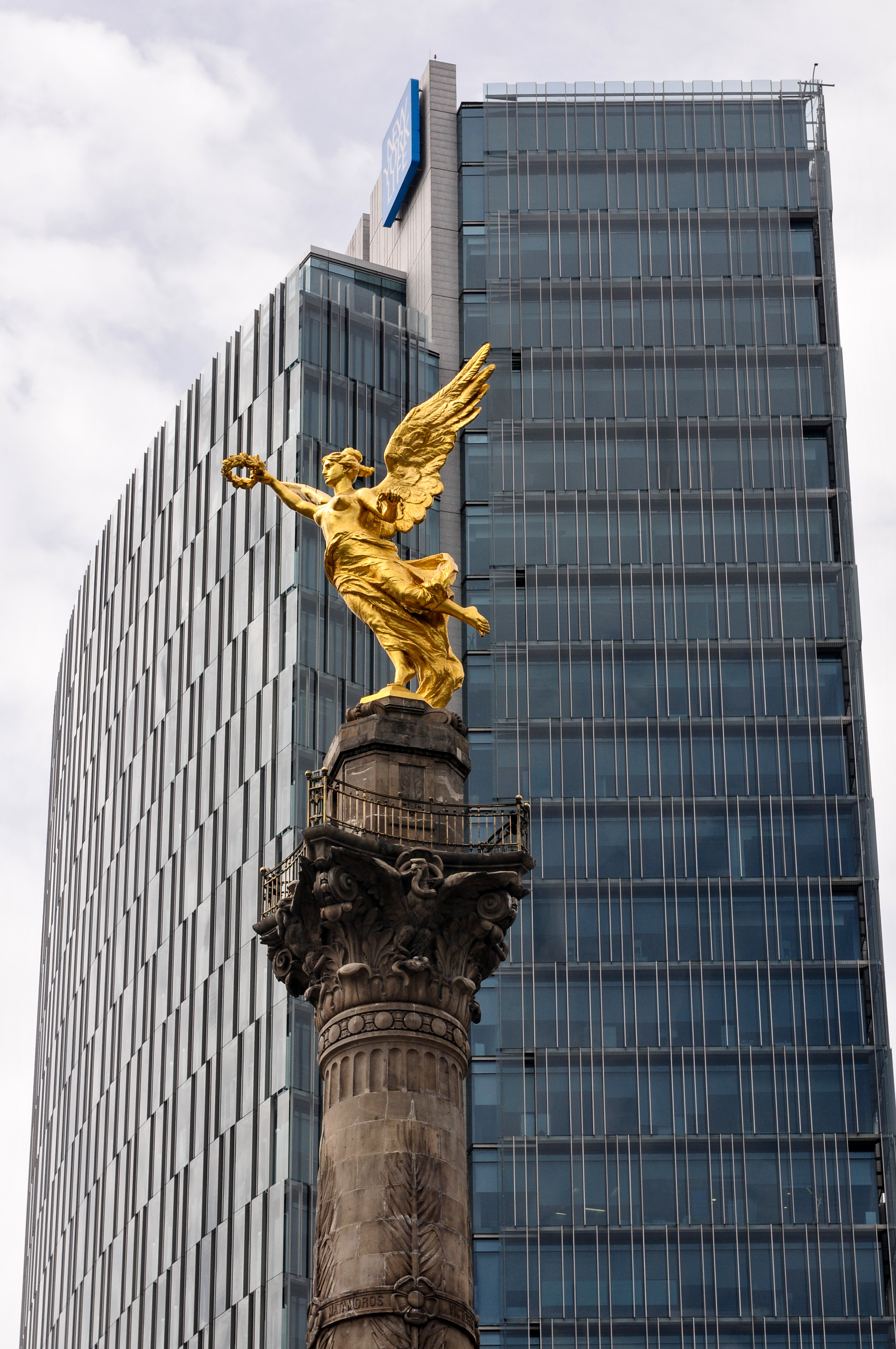
Angel of Independence in Paseo de la Reforma

Cuauhtémoc alone accounts for 35.1% of Mexico City's entire GDP, and by itself, has the seventh-largest economy in Mexico. Most of the borough's economy is based on commerce (52.2%), followed by services (39.4%). The borough is home to a large number of federal and city government buildings, especially in the historic center, Colonia Tabacalera, and Colonia Doctores.

Paseo de la Reforma, especially the section that divides Colonia Juárez from Colonia Cuauhtémoc, is the most modern and constantly developing part of the borough. It is home to the Mexican Stock Exchange, the headquarters of HSBC in Mexico, and Mexico City's tallest skyscrapers, Torre Reforma, Chapultepec Uno, Torre BBVA México, and Torre Mayor.

Construction of office buildings and high-rise apartments continue in the area, causing it to become a distinctive neighborhood of its own; the high-rises that face the avenue are very distinct from the older ones behind them, mostly used for more traditional housing and small businesses. One of the newest major projects in the mid-2000s was Reforma 222, two towers combining office space with residential units.

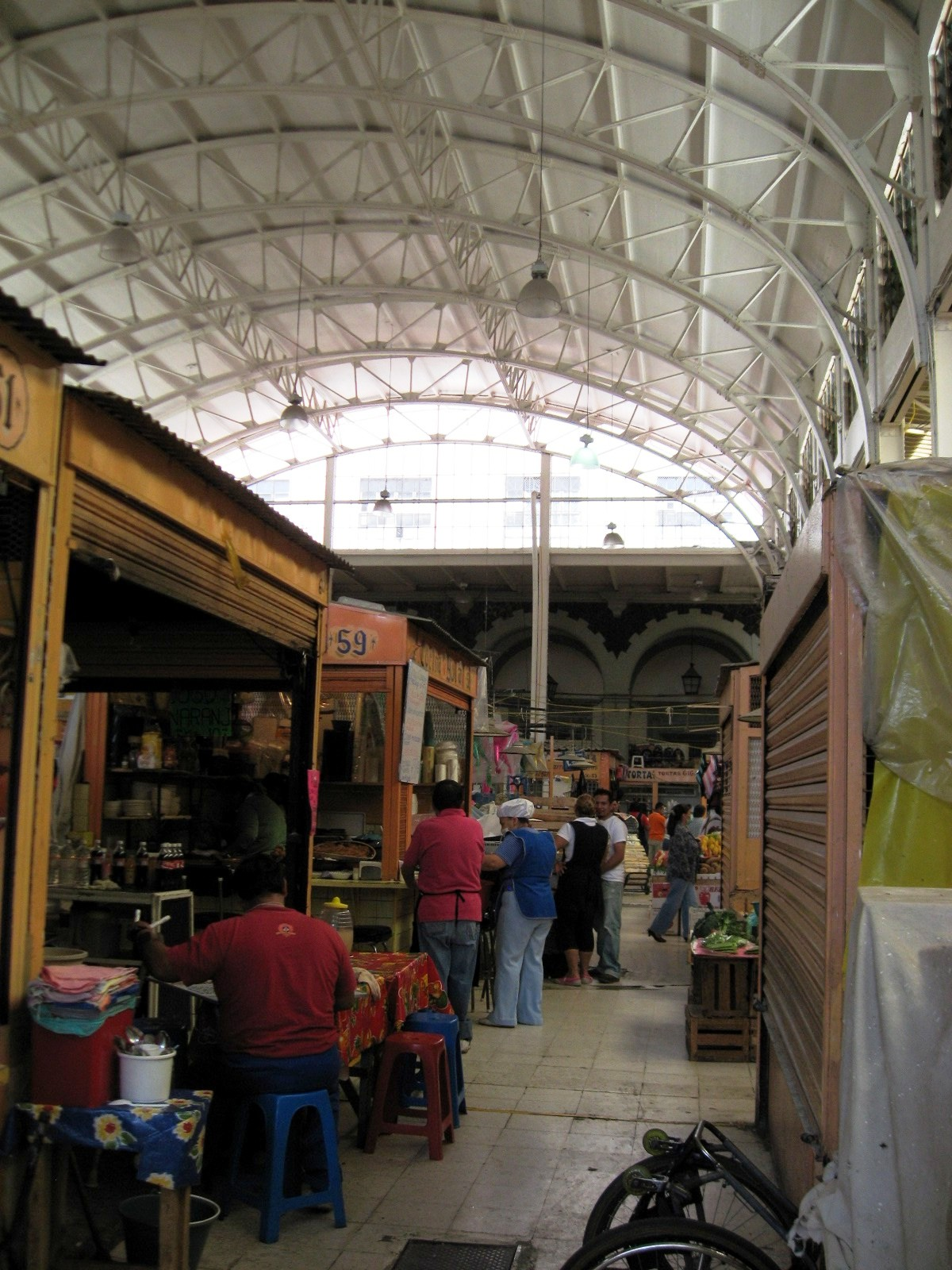
Food vendors in the Abelardo L. Rodriguez Market

In the rest of the borough, commerce is more traditional, with numerous public markets, informal markets called tianguis, and street peddling. Public markets are buildings constructed and maintained by a city or municipal government, which rents stands to private vendors. The largest is La Lagunilla Market, with nearly 2,000 vendors divided among three large warehouse-type buildings. It is known for its large furniture and shoe markets, but most of the vendors sell food and everyday items. Designed to "modernize" the tradition of tianguis or street markets, some were even promoted through art, such as the Abelardo L. Rodriguez Market. Tianguis still survive and can be found in most parts of the borough, as well as in much of the rest of Mexico. In the borough, the best known tianguis are located in Tepito, where 12,000 people do business on the streets.

Tourism plays a major role in the borough's economy. It contains some of the best-known landmarks of Mexico City, so it has become the most visited area of the city by tourists. The most popular areas are the historic center, Alameda Central/Bellas Artes, Reforma, and Zona Rosa. The borough also has the most developed hotel infrastructure, with 389 of the 6,464 hotels in the city. About half of all four- and five-star hotels are located here.

Government is also one of the main employers; the National Government Palace, the Senate of the Republic and Mexico City administrative buildings are located in the borough.

Within Cuauhtémoc, Aeroméxico, and HSBC Mexico have their headquarters in Colonia Cuauhtémoc. Cablemás and Magnicharters have their headquarters in Colonia Juárez.

== Transportation ==
=== Roads ===
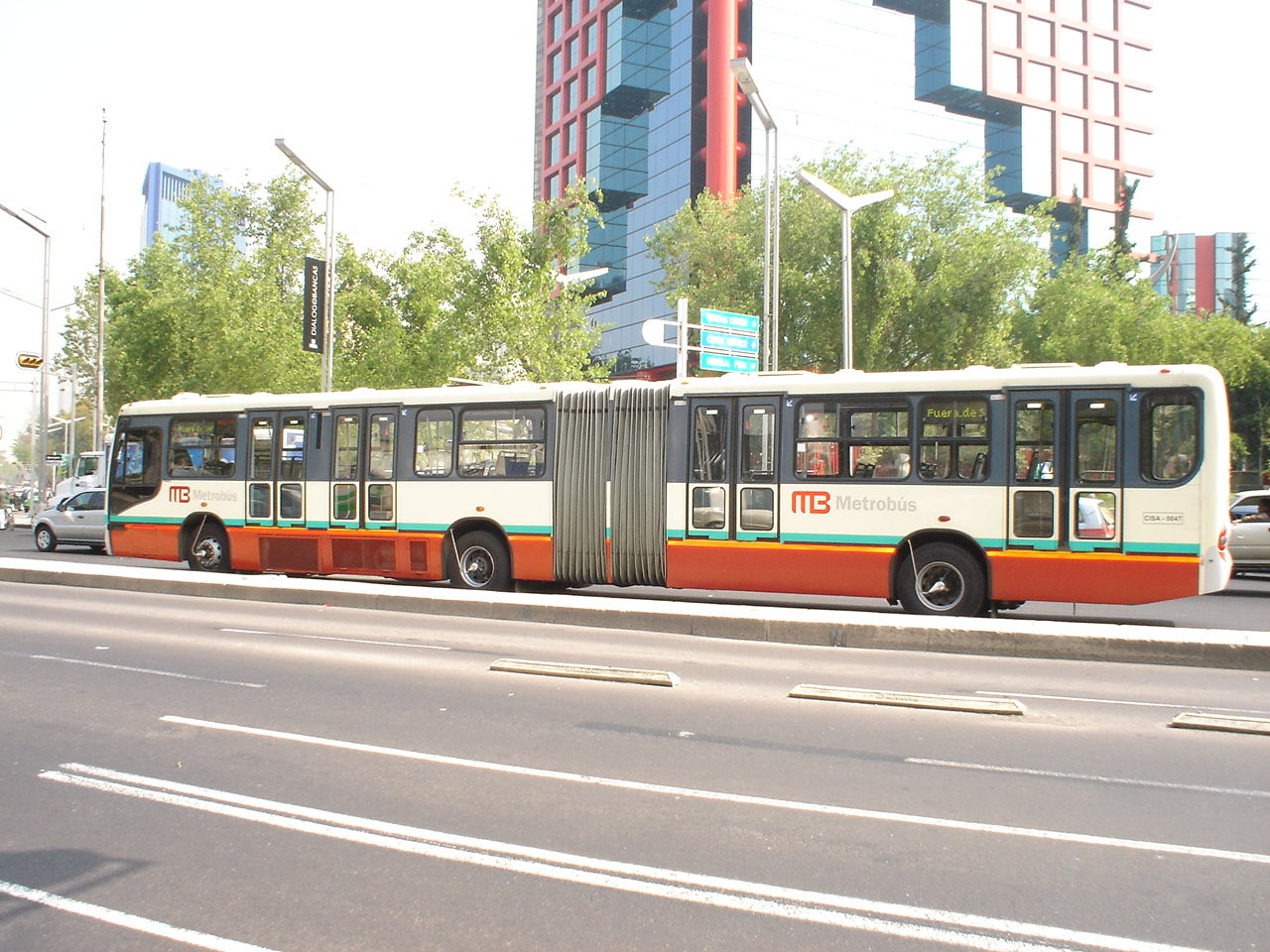
Metrobus on Avenida Insurgentes, Colonia Tabacalera

The borough has 14 million meters of roadways with 314 main intersections. The vast majority of these are current and former residential streets, but three expressways and various axis roads (ejes viales) are available for through traffic.

The three main arteries are the Circuito Interior, Viaducto Miguel Alemán, and San Antonio Abad, which were built for traffic passing through the center of the city. The Circuito Interior, a circular bypass, is the second-most important roadway in the city after the Anillo Periférico.

The ejes viales are a series of north-south and west-east roads built by Carlos Hank González in the 1980s to make Mexico City more automobile-friendly. The largest of these is the Eje Central, which runs north south and divides the historic center in half. Due to the large number of people who enter and leave this borough each day, up to 800,000 vehicles circulate the streets each day, making traffic jams, especially in the historic center, a frequent occurrence.

=== Bicitaxis ===
The cycle rickshaw, known in Mexico as bicitaxi (from the English "bike taxi"), is a popular means of transport in the historic center.

=== Public transportation ===
The borough has the largest number of Metro lines running through it. These include Line 1, Line 2, Line 3, Line 5, Line 8, Line 9, and Line B. There are also trolleybus lines running north-south and east-west, Lines 1 and 3 of the Metrobus as well as numerous bus routes. Another important public transportation service is the Tren Suburbano commuter railway, which has its southern terminal in Colonia Buenavista with service north as far as Cuautitlán in the State of Mexico.

Metro stations

- Chapultepec
- Sevilla
- Insurgentes
- Cuauhtémoc
- Balderas
- Salto del Agua
- Isabel La Católica
- Pino Suárez
- San Cosme
- Revolución
- Hidalgo
- Bellas Artes
- Allende
- Zócalo
- San Antonio Abad
- Chabacano
- Tlatelolco
- Guerrero
- Juárez
- Niños Héroes
- Hospital General
- Centro Médico
- Misterios
- Garibaldi / Lagunilla
- San Juan de Letrán
- Doctores
- Obrera
- Patriotismo
- Chilpancingo
- Lázaro Cárdenas
- Tepito
- Lagunilla
- Buenavista

Tren Suburbano stations

- Buenavista

Metrobús stations

- Circuito
- San Simón
- Manuel González
- Buenavista
- El Chopo
- Revolución
- Plaza de la República
- Reforma (connected through both Reforma and París)
- Hamburgo
- Glorieta de los Insurgentes
- Durango
- Álvaro Obregón
- Sonora
- Campeche
- Chilpancingo
- Nuevo León
- Viaducto
- De La Salle
- Tolnáhuac
- Tlatelolco
- Ricardo Flores Magón
- Guerrero
- Mina
- Hidalgo
- El Caballito (connected through Hidalgo)
- Juárez
- Balderas
- Cuauhtémoc
- Jardín Pushkin
- Hospital General
- Dr. Márquez
- Centro Médico
- Delegación Cuauhtémoc
- Puente de Alvarado
- Museo San Carlos
- Bellas Artes
- Teatro Blanquita
- República de Chile
- República de Argentina
- Mercado Abelardo L. Rodríguez
- Mixcalco
- Plaza de la República
- Glorieta de Colón
- Expo Reforma
- República de Argentina
- Mercado Abelardo L. Rodríguez
- Plaza de la República
- Glorieta de Colón
- Expo Reforma
- Vocacional 5
- Plaza San Juan
- Eje Central
- El Salvador
- Isabel la Católica
- Museo de la Ciudad
- Pino Suárez
- Las Cruces Norte
- Las Cruces Sur
- Mercado Ampudia
- Chapultepec
- La Diana
- El Ángel
- La Palma
- Glorieta Violeta
- Garibaldi
- Glorieta Cuitláhuac
- Tres Culturas
- Mercado Beethoven
- Misterios

== Education ==
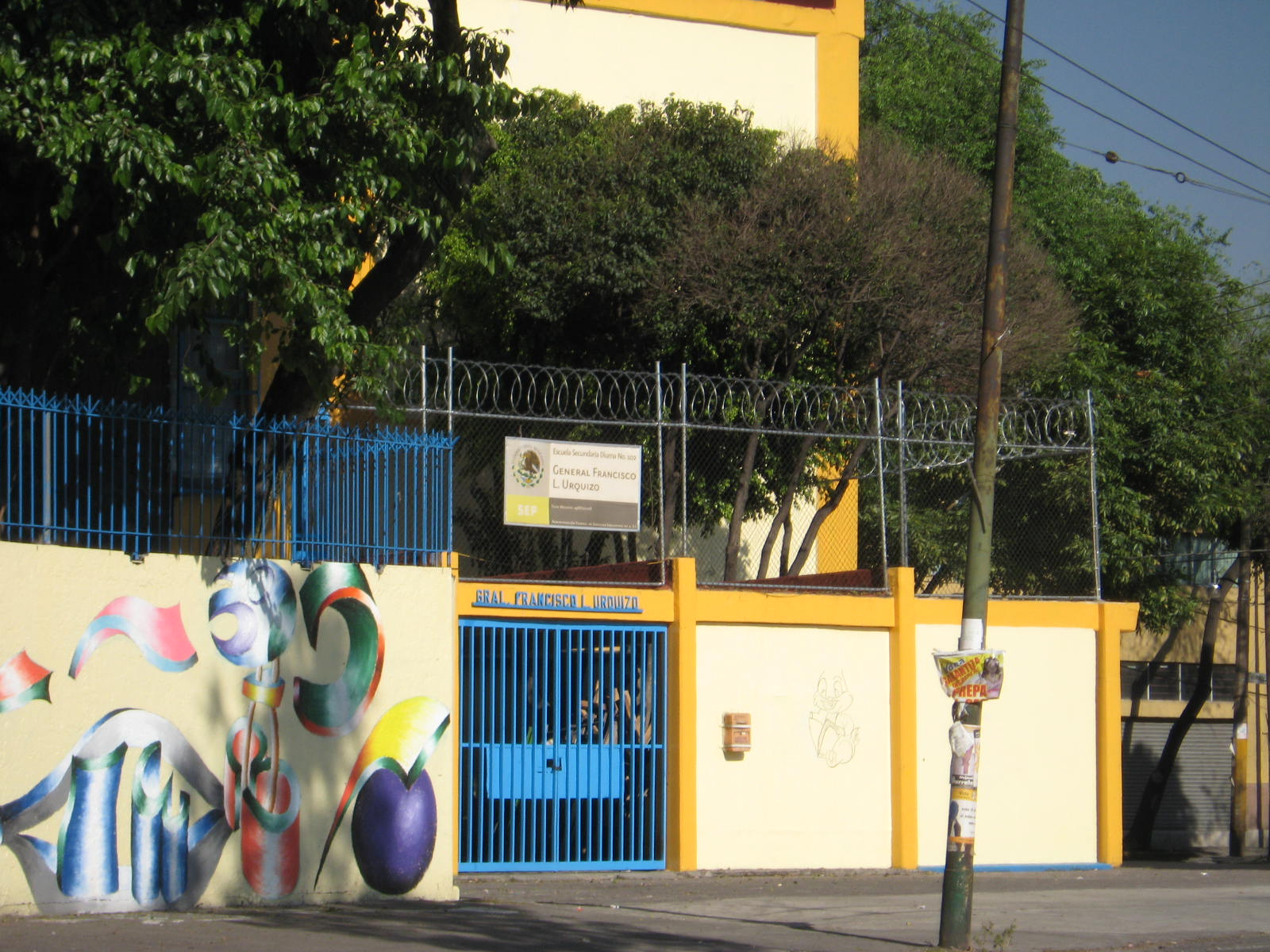
Escuela Secundaria Diurna No. 102 General Francisco L. Urquizo in Colonia Doctores

In the 2007–2008 school year, there were 22,651 K-12 students, about 6.36% of Mexico City's total. 70.64% attend public schools and 29.14% attend private schools. There are 264 public and private preschools, 116 middle schools, 102 technical and regular high schools, and 13 teachers’ colleges. The borough has the lowest level of illiteracy and the highest percentage of students who have finished primary and middle schools, in part because there is a higher than average percentage of private schools, which tend to have better results. The dropout rate, at 7.54%, is better than average.

In 2009, there were 1,737 students receiving special education full or part-time accounting for 4.66% of all special education students in Mexico City. Over 97% of these students get their services from public institutions. However, the borough has limited facilities for adult education, especially for those who do not speak Spanish as their first language or are undereducated. This is problematic due to the influx of indigenous people from rural parts of Mexico.

Private schools:

- Plantel Azahares of the Sistema Educativo Justo Sierra
- Colegio Amado Nervo in Colonia Roma Sur
- Colegio Liceo Mexicano, a private elementary school (Colonia Roma)

Colegio Alemán Alexander von Humboldt previously had a campus at 43 Benjamin G. Hill in Hipódromo Condesa, in what is now a part of Universidad La Salle.

== Climate ==
Climate data for Cuauhtémoc, Mexico City (1951–2010)
Month	Jan	Feb	Mar	Apr	May	Jun	Jul	Aug	Sep	Oct	Nov	Dec	Year
Record high °C (°F)	30.5 (86.9)	32.0 (89.6)	32.5 (90.5)	34.5 (94.1)	35.5 (95.9)	33.5 (92.3)	29.5 (85.1)	29.5 (85.1)	30.0 (86.0)	30.0 (86.0)	30.5 (86.9)	30.5 (86.9)	35.5 (95.9)
Mean daily maximum °C (°F)	23.1 (73.6)	24.8 (76.6)	27.3 (81.1)	28.1 (82.6)	27.7 (81.9)	26.1 (79.0)	24.9 (76.8)	25.1 (77.2)	24.3 (75.7)	24.1 (75.4)	23.7 (74.7)	22.8 (73.0)	25.2 (77.4)
Daily mean °C (°F)	14.2 (57.6)	15.6 (60.1)	18.2 (64.8)	19.6 (67.3)	20.1 (68.2)	19.7 (67.5)	18.8 (65.8)	18.9 (66.0)	18.4 (65.1)	17.4 (63.3)	15.8 (60.4)	14.6 (58.3)	17.6 (63.7)
Mean daily minimum °C (°F)	5.4 (41.7)	6.5 (43.7)	9.0 (48.2)	11.1 (52.0)	12.5 (54.5)	13.3 (55.9)	12.7 (54.9)	12.7 (54.9)	12.6 (54.7)	10.7 (51.3)	7.9 (46.2)	6.3 (43.3)	10.1 (50.2)
Record low °C (°F)	−4.5 (23.9)	−2.5 (27.5)	−0.5 (31.1)	3.5 (38.3)	6.5 (43.7)	7.5 (45.5)	7.5 (45.5)	6.0 (42.8)	4.5 (40.1)	2.5 (36.5)	−1.5 (29.3)	−2.0 (28.4)	−4.5 (23.9)
Average precipitation mm (inches)	7.9 (0.31)	3.7 (0.15)	8.1 (0.32)	28.0 (1.10)	58.7 (2.31)	118.0 (4.65)	127.1 (5.00)	110.9 (4.37)	105.1 (4.14)	48.2 (1.90)	8.2 (0.32)	4.5 (0.18)	628.4 (24.74)
Average precipitation days (≥ 0.1 mm)	1.5	1.9	2.8	7.3	11.5	16.3	20.1	18.5	15.4	8.0	2.9	1.6	107.8
Source: Servicio Meteorológico National

== International relations ==
=== Foreign government operations ===
The British Embassy and the Japanese Embassy are in Colonia Cuauhtémoc, Cuauhtémoc. The Embassy of the United States, Mexico City was moved to Miguel Hidalgo.

=== Sister boroughs ===
- South Korea Seocho (2020)
