= Colonia Vista Alegre =

Coordinates: 19°24′36.93″N 99°7′59.06″W

Vista Alegre
- Neighborhood of Mexico City
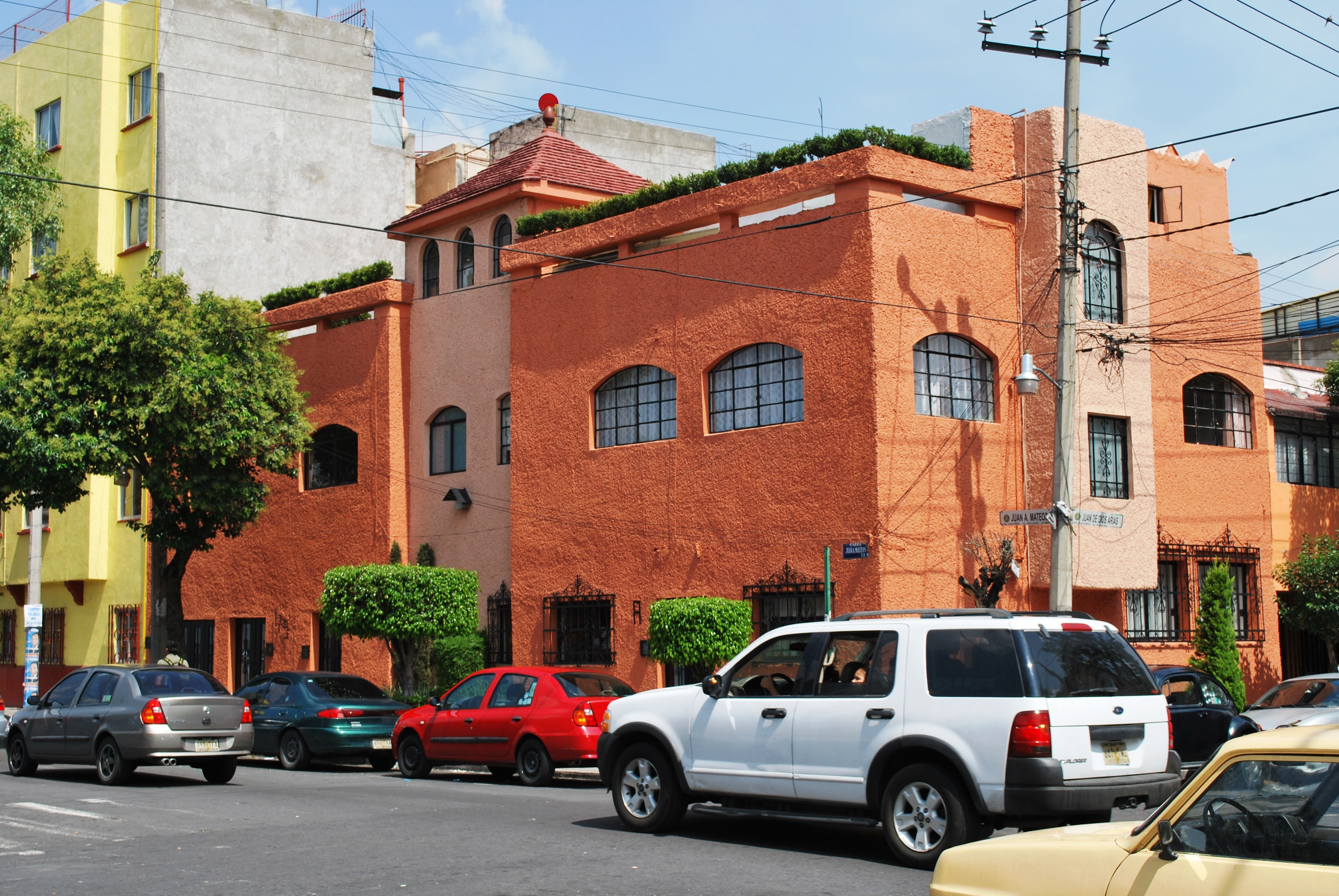
- Intersection of Juan A. Mateos and Juan de Dios Arias streets

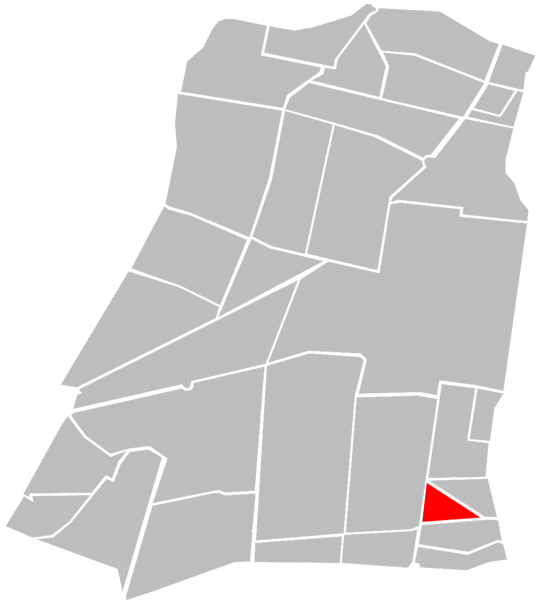
- Location of Colonia Vista Alegre (in red) within Cuauhtémoc borough
- Country: Mexico
- City: Mexico City
- Borough: Cuauhtémoc

Population
  - Total: 3,400
- Postal code: 06860

Colonia Vista Alegre is a colonia in the Cuauhtémoc borough of Mexico City just south of the city's historic center. The boundaries of the colonia are formed by the following streets: Calzada de Chabacano to the south, José T. Cuellar to the north, Colonia Paulino Narvarro to the east and the Calzada de Tlalpan to the west. The name, which translates to "Happy View," derives from the view of what was then countryside which permitted views of the Popocatépetl and Iztaccíhuatl volcanos as well as the Sierra del Ajusco and Sierra de las Cruces mountains.

== History ==
In 1884, the city council authorized Eduardo Zozaya and Santiago Kerm to establish a number of residential subdivisions on former horse lands known as San Nicolás Tultengo and Santa Crucita. However, the initial project was not successful. Houses did not begin to be constructed in this area until the 1910s. In the 1920s, the area began to develop in an orderly manner. At first the area developed as the very large Colonia de la Paz, which included modern Colonia Tránsito, Colonia Esperanza, Colonia Paulino Navarro, Colonia Asturias and Colonia Ampliación Asturias.

In 2003, a four-story building on Jose T. Cuellar collapsed while a party was in progress. The event destroyed the home of 13 families and temporarily dislocated 120 families from adjacent buildings. The collapsed building was damaged by the 1985 earthquake, and the collapse was attributed to the former damage. Subsequent evaluations by the city identified 64 similarly damaged buildings in and near the historic center. These properties were expropriated by the city government in order to prevent another collapse of an occupied building.

== Transportation ==
=== Public transportation ===
The area is served by the Mexico City Metro.

Metro stations

- Chabacano
