= Colonia Ampliación Asturias =

Neighborhood of Mexico City, Mexico

Coordinates: 19°24′27.17″N 99°7′51.8″W

Colonia Ampliación Asturias is a neighborhood in the Cuauhtémoc borough of Mexico City. It is located southeast of the historic center of Mexico City. It borders are marked by the following streets, to the north Eje Tres Sur or Avenida Calzada del Chabacano, Calzada de la Viga to the east, Calzada de San Antonio Abad to the west and Hernandez Davalos street to the south.

The origins of the neighborhood are based in the extension of neighboring Colonia Asturias. "Ampliación" means "amplification." Prior to the 1940s, the area was pasture and farmland, growing alfalfa and corn. The original Colonia Asturias is marked by Calzada del Chabacano, formerly known as Calzada de San Estaban. This road was extended to the La Viga area along a canal that was here. This canal, which passed the length of the current neighborhood, was an important venue to transport goods for sale and consumption, using wind or steam-powered boats. This canal connected with another called La Esperanza, which connected to the canals that connected the center of Mexico City to Chalco in the 19th century. However, by the end of the centuries, dropping groundwater tables dried up enough of the canals to make transport between these two entities impossible in this manner.

The drying of the area allowed for road construction and the creation of this colonia, along with the expansion of Asturias and the creation of Colonia Vista Alegre. Connecting them is Calazada de Chabacano, named such for the large quantity of apricot (chabacano) trees that used to grow in the area.

One of the main Metro stations serving the neighborhood is Metro Chabacano, from which pass Lines 2 and 8 which pass on the edges of the colonia. Line 8 passes through the neighborhood and connects Metro Chabacano with Metro La Viga, which is on the eastern border of the colonia.

The neighborhood is part of the Cuauhtémoc borough, which is home to seven of the ten most crime-plagued colonias in Mexico City. Although Ampliación Asturias is not one of these seven neighborhoods, it has one reputed "hot spot" for crime, which is the area around Calzada de Chabacano, Jose A Torres, Juan A Mateos and Jose Sotero Castañeda streets in the area that borders with Colonia Vista Alegre.
