= Chabacano metro station =

Mexico City Metro station

Chabacano
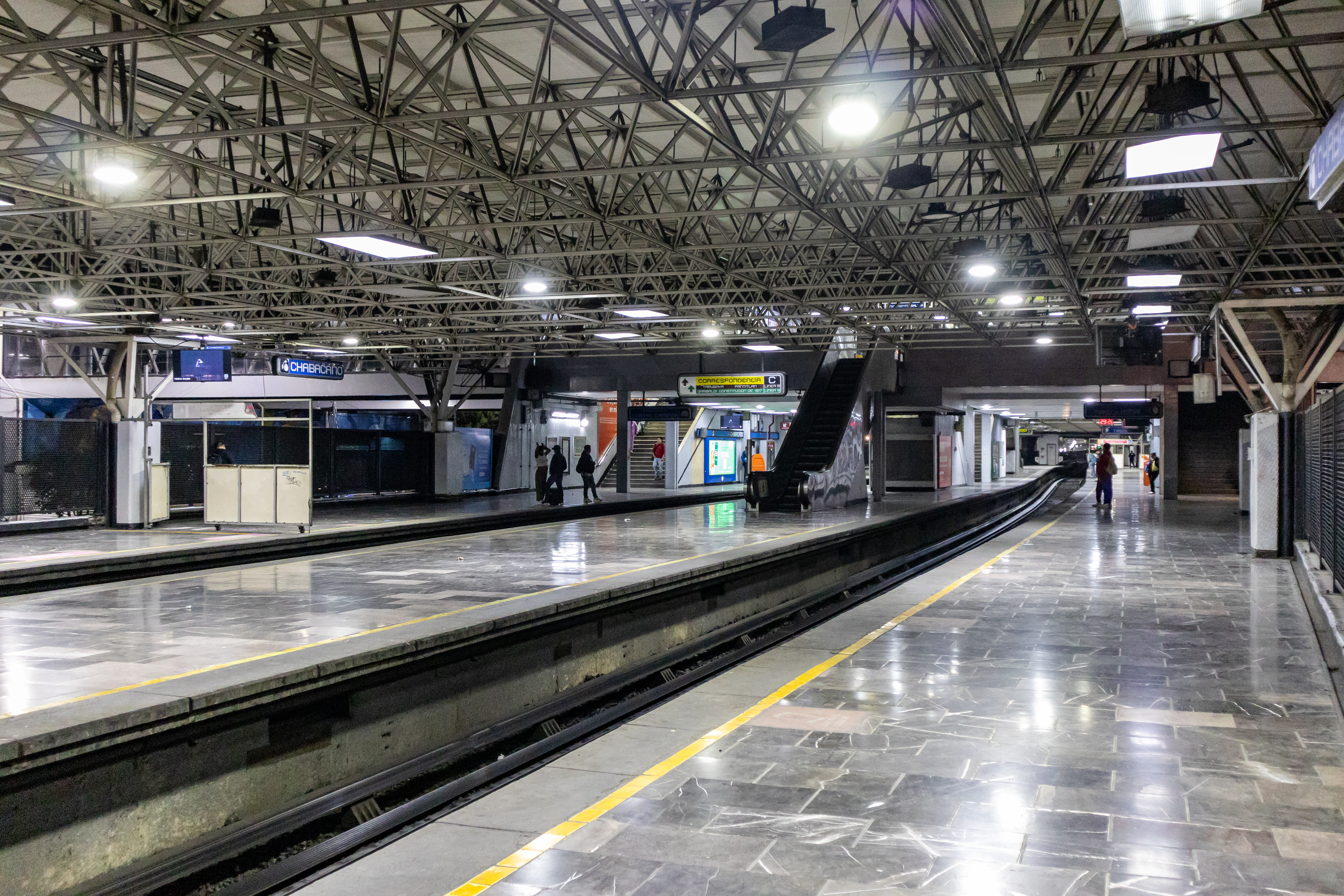
- Line 2 platforms, 2025

General information
- Location: Calzada de Tlalpan; Cuauhtémoc, Mexico City; Mexico
- Coordinates: 19°24′33″N 99°08′08″W
- System: Mexico City Metro
- Owner: Government of Mexico City
- Operator: Sistema de Transporte Colectivo (STC)
- Platforms: 2 side platforms; 1 island platform each (9 platforms in total)
- Tracks: 6
- Connections: Routes: 2-A, 31-B, 33, 111-A, 145-A; Routes: 9-C, 9-E, 14-A, 17-C, 17-H, 17-I; Various local service routes

Construction
- Structure type: At grade; Underground; Underground
- Accessible: Yes

Other information
- Status: In service

History
- Opened: 1 August 1970; 56 years ago; 20 July 1994; 32 years ago; 26 August 1987; 39 years ago
- Rebuilt: 1987

Passengers
- 2025: 11,969,655 (Note: The Mexico City Metro system records entries at interchange stations separately. Individually, Line 2 saw 7,932,688 passengers, Line 8 had 1,479,067 passengers, and Line 9 recorded 1,273,326 passengers.) (Note: The system's website counts only passenger entries into stations and does not include passengers passing through, transferring between lines, or exiting the station. The data here is limited to the most recent ten years to avoid excessive listings; earlier figures can be found in this page's history or on the Mexico City Metro website. To calculate the average daily ridership, the annual total is divided by 365 days (366 in leap years), with decimals omitted from the result. Each station per line is ranked individually, as the system counts transfer stations separately. The percentage change is calculated automatically using the data from the current year and the previous year.) ▲11.42%
- Rank: 47/195; 188/195; 155/195

Services
Preceding station	Mexico City Metro	Following station
San Antonio Abad toward Cuatro Caminos	Line 2	Viaducto toward Tasqueña
Obrera toward Garibaldi / Lagunilla	Line 8	La Viga toward Constitución de 1917
Lázaro Cárdenas toward Tacubaya	Line 9	Jamaica toward Pantitlán
Route map
Location
- Location within Mexico City
- Area map and exits

Chabacano metro station (Note: Estación del Metro Chabacano. Mexican Spanish pronunciation: [tʃaβaˈkano]. The name of the station means "apricot" in Mexican Spanish.) is a transfer station on the Mexico City Metro in Cuauhtémoc, Mexico City. Chabacano is a combined underground and at-grade station divided into three lines, each with two side platforms and one island platform, employing the Spanish solution layout. It serves Lines 2 (Blue Line), 8 (Green Line), and 9 (Brown Line).

Chabacano metro station is located between San Antonio Abad and Viaducto stations on Line 2, between Obrera and La Viga stations on Line 8, and between Lázaro Cárdenas and Jamaica stations on Line 9. It serves the colonias (neighborhoods) of Ampliación Asturias, Obrera, and Vista Alegre. The station's pictogram features an apricot and its name derives from a nearby street that once had several apricot trees.

Chabacano metro station opened on 1 August 1970, initially providing northbound service on Line 2 toward Pino Suárez station and southbound service toward Tasqueña station. Service on Line 9, running west to east from Centro Médico to Pantitlán, began on 26 August 1987. Line 8 service, with trains running southeast toward Constitución de 1917 and north toward Garibaldi station, commenced on 20 July 1994. The Line 2 station was rebuilt when the transfer facilities were constructed.

The station is accessible to people with disabilities, with elevators, escalators and wheelchair ramps. Outside, several local bus routes serve the area. Inside are an Internet café, an information desk, a cultural showcase, a private library, and a mural titled Civilización y Cultura by José de Guimarães. The station was used as a filming location for the 1990 film Total Recall, starring Arnold Schwarzenegger. Javier Álvarez named a composition after the station. In 2025, the station recorded an average of 32,793 daily passenger entries.

== Location and layout ==
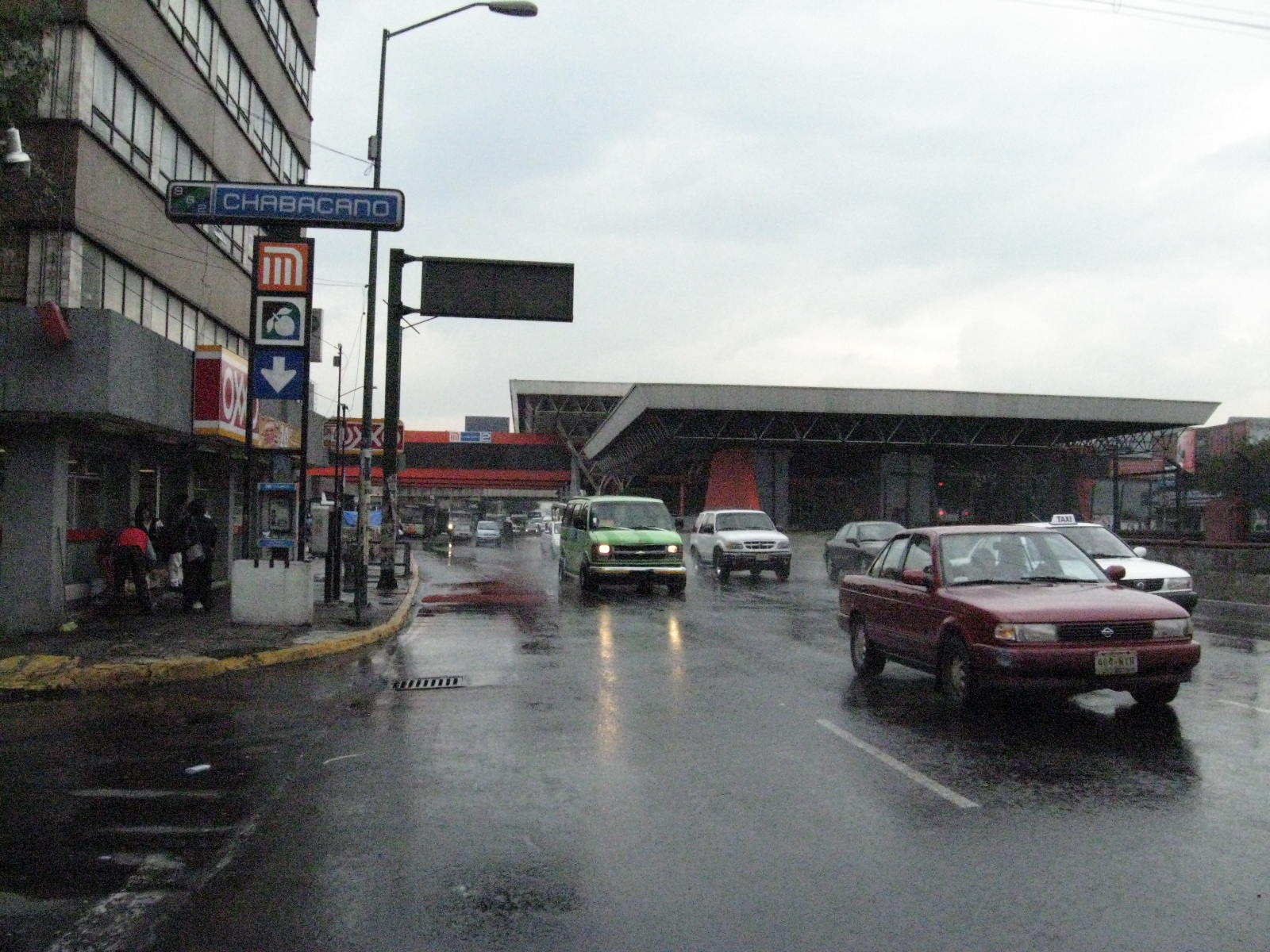
Line 2 station in 2008 along Calzada de Tlalpan

Chabacano is a transfer metro station, located in the Cuauhtémoc borough, in central Mexico City. It is situated along Calzada de Tlalpan (Line 2), beneath Calle Juan A. Mateos (Line 8) and beneath Eje 3 Sur – Calzada Chabacano (Line 9). The station serves three colonias (neighborhoods) of Ampliación Asturias, Obrera, and Vista Alegre.

Chabacano metro station serves as an interchange for three lines. It is located between San Antonio Abad and Viaducto stations on Line 2, between Obrera and La Viga stations on Line 8, and between Lázaro Cárdenas and Jamaica stations on Line 9.

Several bus routes serve the station. The Red de Transporte de Pasajeros (RTP) bus system includes Routes 2-A, 31-B, 33, 111-A, and 145-A, while the public bus system includes Routes 9-C, 9-E, 14-A, 17-C, 17-H, and 17-I.

Chabacano metro station has multiple exits serving its various lines. For Line 2, there are two exits: the eastern exit is located between Calle Juan A. Mateos, Calzada Chabacano, and Avenida San Antonio Abad in Colonia Vista Alegre, while the western exit is located between Calle Manuel Caballero, Calle Antonio Solís, and Avenida San Antonio Abad in Colonia Obrera.

Line 8 has three exits: north, southeast, and southwest. These are located at the respective corners of Calle Juan A. Mateos and Calle Vicente Beristain in Colonia Vista Alegre. Line 9 has four exits: the northeast and southeast exits are located at the corners of Calzada Chabacano and Calle J. Antonio Torres X in Colonia Vista Alegre, while the northwest and southwest exits are at the corners of Calzada Chabacano and Calle Francisco Ayala in Colonia Ampliación Asturias.

Unlike the system's other transfer stations, which are linked by underground tunnels, the transfer passageway between Lines 2 and 9 is elevated due to limited space for a tunnel. The bridge crosses several houses and streets and is 200 meters (660 ft) long. Commuters using Line 8 must navigate two additional sets of stairs that connect to a tunnel running between Calle Francisco Ayala and Calle Vicente Beristain.

== History and construction ==
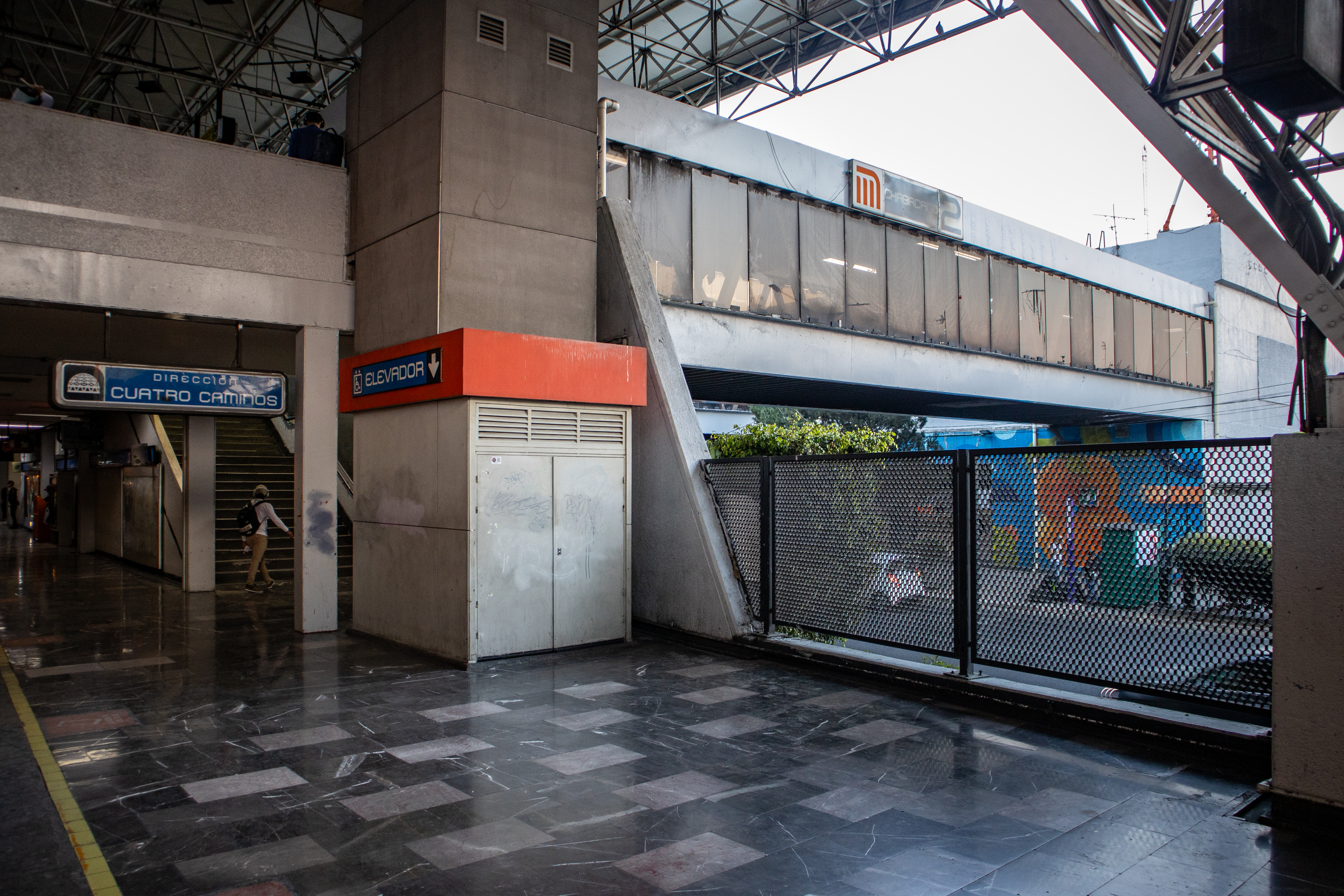
The transfer bridge connecting Lines 2 and 9

=== Name and pictogram ===
The station is named after the avenue of the same name, which once had several apricot trees, and its pictogram features the silhouette of its fruit. Chabacano means "apricot" in Mexican Spanish; in other regions, it can mean "tacky" or "vulgar".

=== Line 2 ===
The line was built by Ingeniería de Sistemas de Transportes Metropolitano, Electrometro, and Cometro, the latter being a subsidiary of Empresas ICA. Chabacano station opened on 1 August 1970, as part of the inaugural Pino Suárez–Tasqueña service. The station was built at grade level with a design similar to other stations in the at-grade section, including an island platform. The section between Chabacano and San Antonio Abad is 642 meters (2,106 ft) long, while the section between Chabacano and Viaducto measures 774 meters (2,539 ft).

When construction of Lines 8 and 9 began, the station was rebuilt to improve passenger boarding and alighting. The Spanish solution was implemented across all platforms, whereby alighting passengers use the central platform, while boarding passengers use the side platforms on the opposite side of the train. The station offers accessibility features, including four elevators.

As part of preparations for the 2026 FIFA World Cup, authorities implemented partial closures at the station starting on 9 February 2026, to carry out rehabilitation work on the line. The station was connected to the Jardín Flotante Tlallipan, a pedestrian overpass built during the renovation works that runs above the Line 2 tracks toward Pino Suárez.

=== Line 8 ===
ICA built the line, whose first and only section opened on 20 July 1994, running from Garibaldi to Constitución de 1917. Chabacano is an underground station; the tunnel between Chabacano and Obrera is 1,143 meters (3,750 ft) long, while the section between Chabacano and La Viga measures 843 meters (2,766 ft).

=== Line 9 ===
Cometro built the line, whose first section, including Chabacano, opened on 26 August 1987, running from Centro Médico towards Pantitlán station. Chabacano is an underground station; the tunnel to Lázaro Cárdenas is 1,000 meters (3,300 ft) long, while the tunnel toward Jamaica measures 1,031 meters (3,383 ft) long.

The station provides accessible facilities, including wheelchair ramps, two elevators, and escalators. These facilities were renovated in 2021 to address obsolescence.

=== Incidents ===
On 28 December 2010, an elderly passenger attempting to help two people who had dropped their belongings onto the tracks fell onto the rails and was struck and killed by an approaching Line 2 train. On 4 June 2018, a law student was arrested for attempting to access the Benito Juárez library inside the station after the station manager denied him entry, stating that it was reserved for metro personnel. The public prosecutor’s office declined to pursue charges, deeming the restriction unjustified under the City Libraries Code, as the facility is located in a public space. Metro authorities later clarified that the library is open to the general public upon registration.

On 12 September 2020, the station was vandalized by feminists protesting reported cases of harassment and restrictions on street vendors within the metro system. Following the collapse of a bridge on Line 12, which resulted in 26 deaths, demonstrators vandalized the station again and assaulted metro staff, whom they held responsible for the accident. On 1 April 2022, a woman slipped on an escalator, triggering a chain reaction that knocked down seven other people, all of whom sustained minor injuries.

== Landmarks, cultural events and popular culture ==
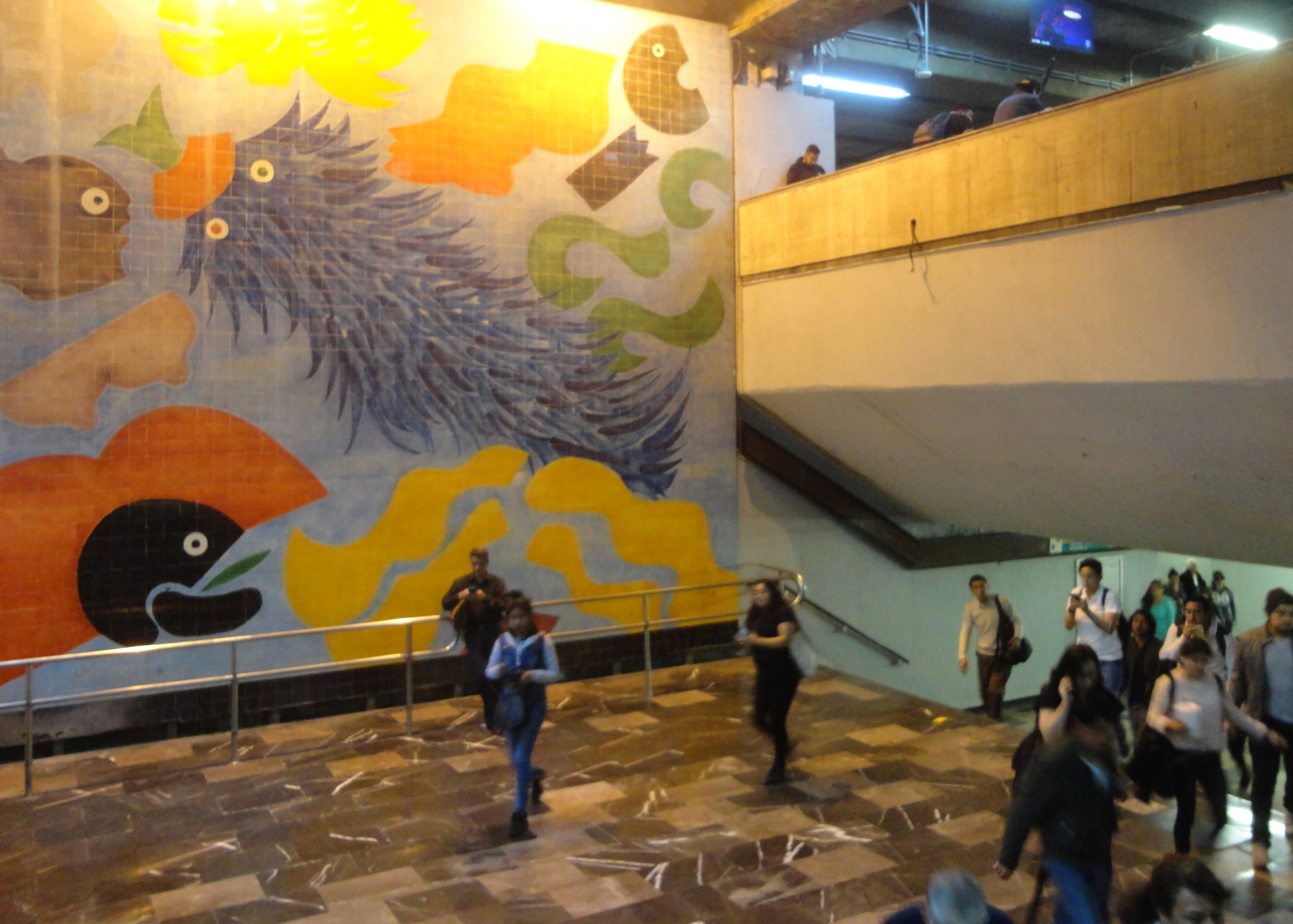
Part of the mural Cultura y Civilización

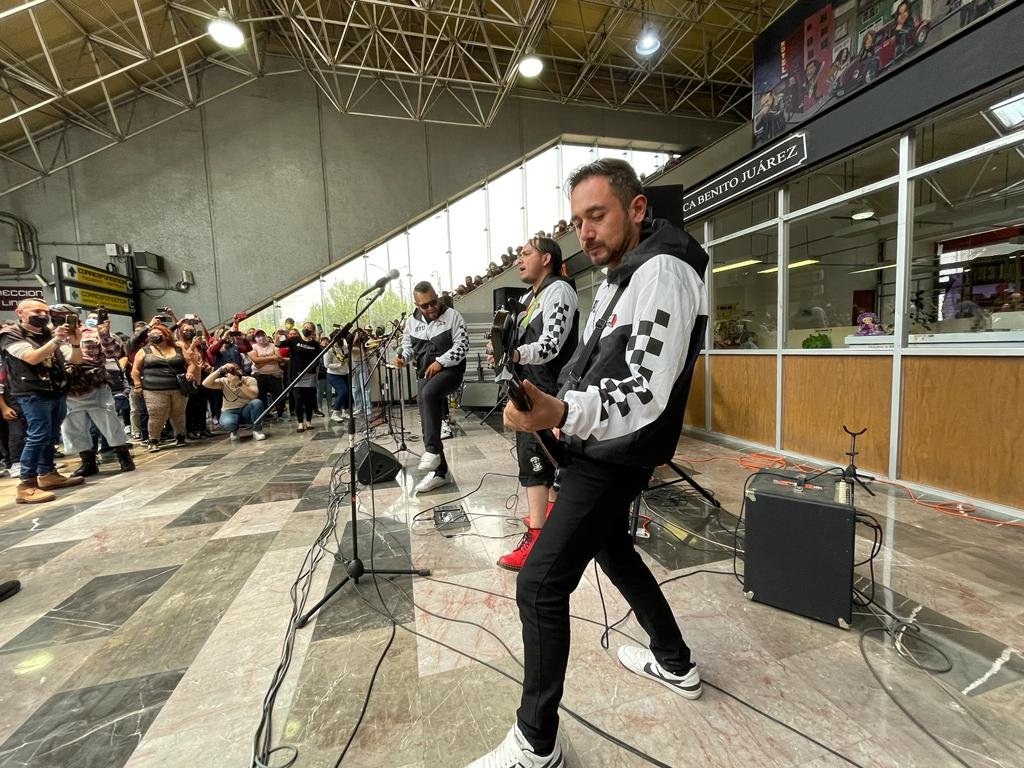
La Silueta Ska performing in the lobby of Line 9

The station includes an Internet café, an information desk, a cultural display, a private library, and a mural titled Civilización y Cultura (English: "Culture and Civilization") by Portuguese artist José de Guimarães. Created on a 120-square-meter (1,300 sq ft) ceramic surface, the mural is divided into two sections and is located on Line 9. Inaugurated on 6 November 1996, it features elements from the pre-Hispanic cultures of Mesoamerica. According to de Guimarães, "two fundamental archetypes have prevailed throughout the centuries [in pre-Hispanic culture in Mexico]: the serpent as a symbol of water-life and the jaguar as a symbol of earth-fertility. Without these two important elements for man, history would not take place".

Due to its size, Chabacano metro station has held cultural programs in its lobby. The station has hosted mini-concerts featuring musicians such as Trans-X, Ji-Hae Park, and the Orquesta Sinfónica de Yucatán.

Scenes from the 1990 film Total Recall were filmed at the station at night. Starring Arnold Schwarzenegger and set in the year 2084. The film depicts a future in which humanity has colonized Mars. In one scene on Earth, Douglas Quaid, a secret agent with erased memories, escapes from attackers by entering a subway station and leaping through the window of an outbound train. During filming, Schwarzenegger accidentally cut his wrist when the crew failed to detonate the window on time. To transform the building for the scene, the film crew painted the walls and a train in cement gray, covered the signage, and added monitors throughout the station. Mexican composer Javier Álvarez named one of his compositions after the metro station. It was played live by the Cuarteto Latinoamericano at the station during an exhibition in September 1991.

By 2020, the station and its surrounding area had become a popular location for buying and selling used and vintage clothing, particularly on weekends.

== Ridership ==
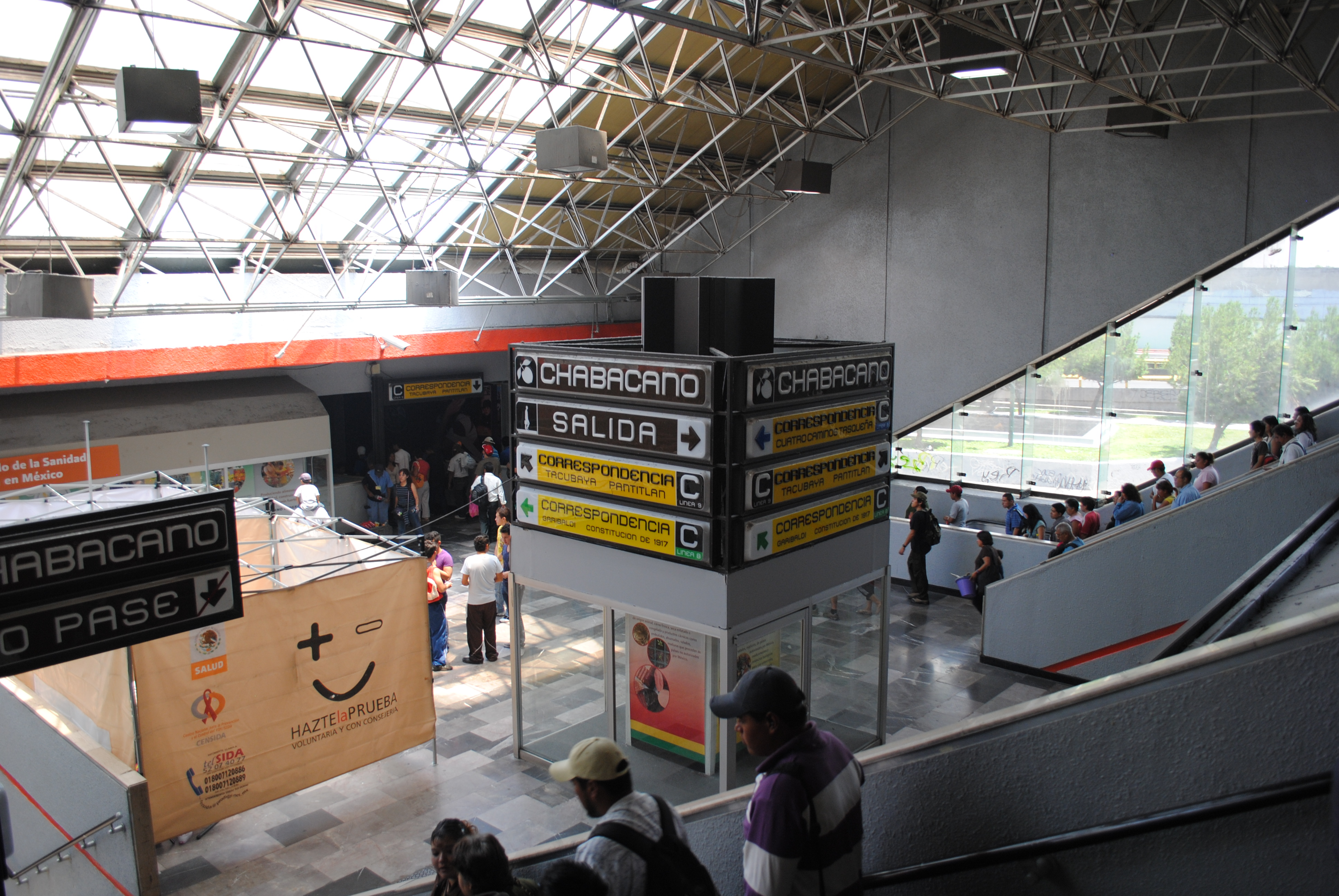
Passengers descend the stairs from Line 2. In the background is the transfer tunnel to Line 9, while access to Line 8 is via an additional set of stairs.

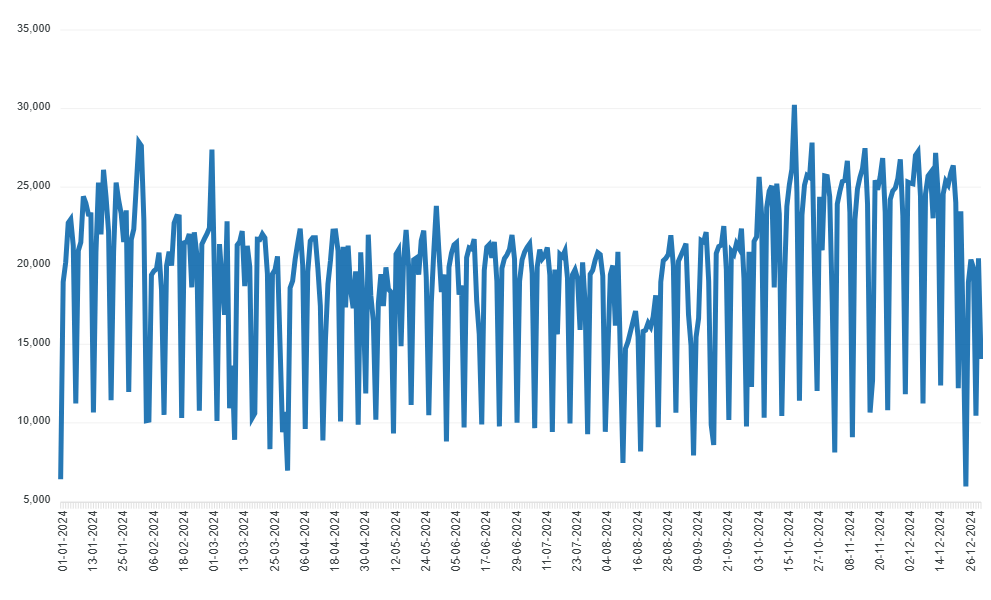
Daily ridership for Line 2 in 2024

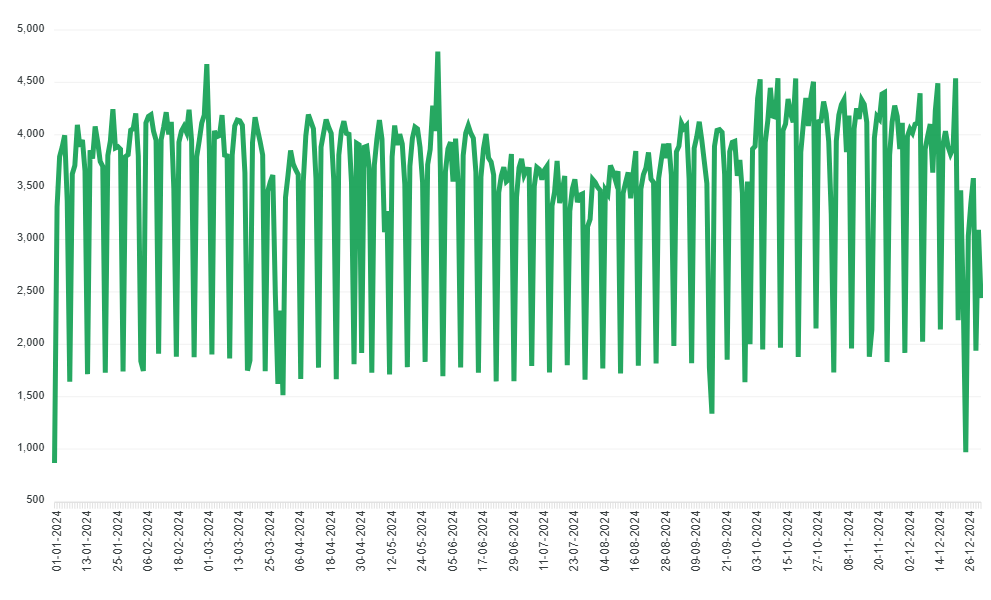
Daily ridership for Line 8 in 2024

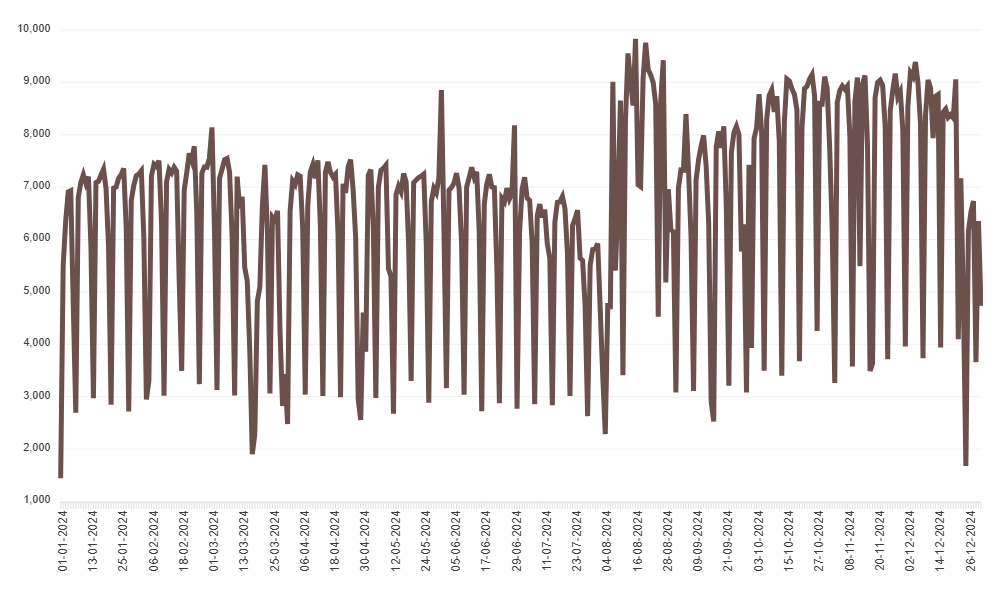
Daily ridership for Line 9 in 2024

According to official data, Line 2 records higher usage than Lines 8 and 9, which are among the least accessed in the system. Prior to the impact of the COVID-19 pandemic the station recorded a total ridership of 15,920,404 passengers in 2019, averaging 43,584 daily entries. System authorities estimated that an average of 83,000 passengers traveled through the station daily in 2021.

The station's total ridership for 2025 was 11,969,655 passengers, with a daily average of 32,793 entries. By line, Line 2 recorded 7,932,688 passengers, averaging 21,733 per day. Line 8 recorded 1,273,326 passengers, averaging 3,488 per day. Line 9 recorded 2,763,641 passengers, averaging 7,571 per day.

In 2025, when considered individually among the system's 195 stations, the Line 2 station ranked 47th busiest; the Line 8 station ranked 188th in the system, while the Line 9 station ranked 155th.

Annual passenger ridership (Line 2)
Year	Ridership	Average daily	Rank	% change	Ref.
2025	7,932,688	21,733	47/195	+12.40%	
2024	7,057,566	19,282	53/195	−11.84%	
2023	8,005,603	21,933	43/195	+9.53%	
2022	8,005,603	20,024	43/195	+62.52%	
2021	4,497,267	12,321	61/195	−32.96%	
2020	6,707,998	18,327	34/195	−35.83%	
2019	10,452,786	28,637	47/195	−3.49%	
2018	10,831,155	29,674	45/195	+5.52%	
2017	10,264,980	28,123	47/195	−0.07%	
2016	10,272,203	28,066	49/195	+0.34%	

Annual passenger ridership (Line 8)
Year	Ridership	Average daily	Rank	% change	Ref.
2025	1,273,326	3,488	188/195	−0.78%	
2024	1,283,378	3,506	180/195	−13.23%	
2023	1,479,067	4,052	170/195	+26.33%	
2022	1,170,770	3,207	171/195	+18.48%	
2021	988,177	2,707	177/195	+11.73%	
2020	884,432	2,416	189/195	−43.12%	
2019	1,554,977	4,260	191/195	−1.02%	
2018	1,571,045	4,304	191/195	+10.33%	
2017	1,424,001	3,901	191/195	+2.15%	
2016	1,394,042	3,808	191/195	+0.44%	

Annual passenger ridership (Line 9)
Year	Ridership	Average daily	Rank	% change	Ref.
2025	2,763,641	7,571	155/195	+15.07%	
2024	2,401,683	6,561	155/195	−21.87%	
2023	3,073,903	8,421	132/195	−0.58%	
2022	3,091,961	8,471	128/195	+9.90%	
2021	2,813,390	7,707	117/195	+32.75%	
2020	2,119,283	5,790	150/195	−45.83%	
2019	3,912,641	10,719	150/195	−2.54%	
2018	4,014,545	10,998	146/195	+0.42%	
2017	3,997,946	10,953	143/195	−0.01%	
2016	3,998,201	10,924	144/195	+0.59%	
