= Metro Chabacano (Álvarez) =

1991 string quartet composition

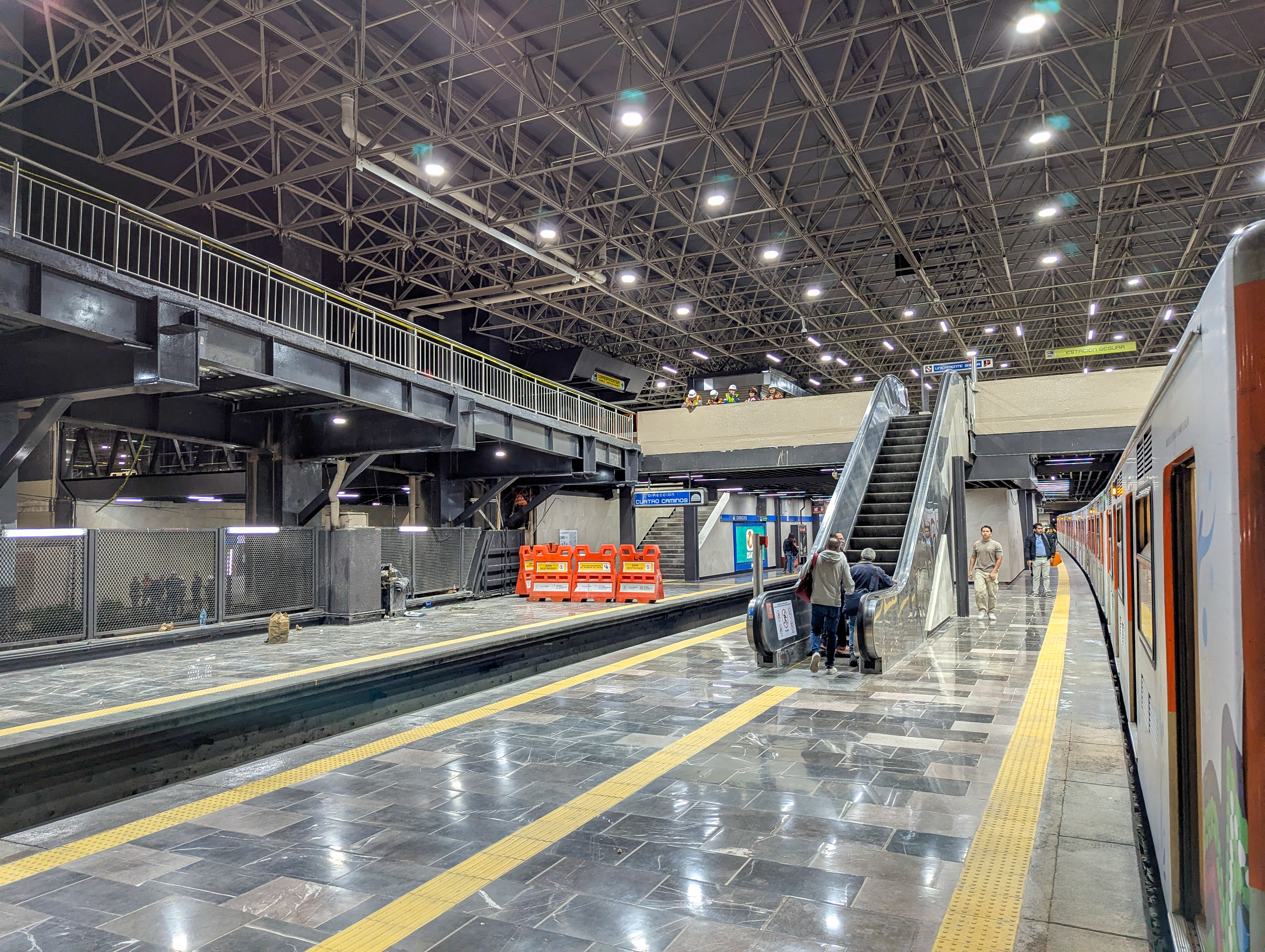
"Metro Chabacano" was named after the Mexico City Metro station of the same name (Line 2 platforms pictured).

Metro Chabacano is a string quartet composition by Mexican composer Javier Álvarez (1956–2023), named after the Chabacano metro station in Mexico City. The musical piece originated as a work dedicated to his parents in 1988. In 1991, Álvarez recomposed it for an exhibition of kinetic sculptures by Marcos Límenes at the metro station. The revised version was premiered and recorded by the Cuarteto Latinoamericano and performed live at the exhibition's inauguration. It has since been adapted as a string orchestra, and performed by ensembles including the Brodsky Quartet, Camerata Romeu, and St. Lawrence String Quartet, as well as in orchestral settings conducted by Alondra de la Parra and Keri-Lynn Wilson.

== Background and composition ==
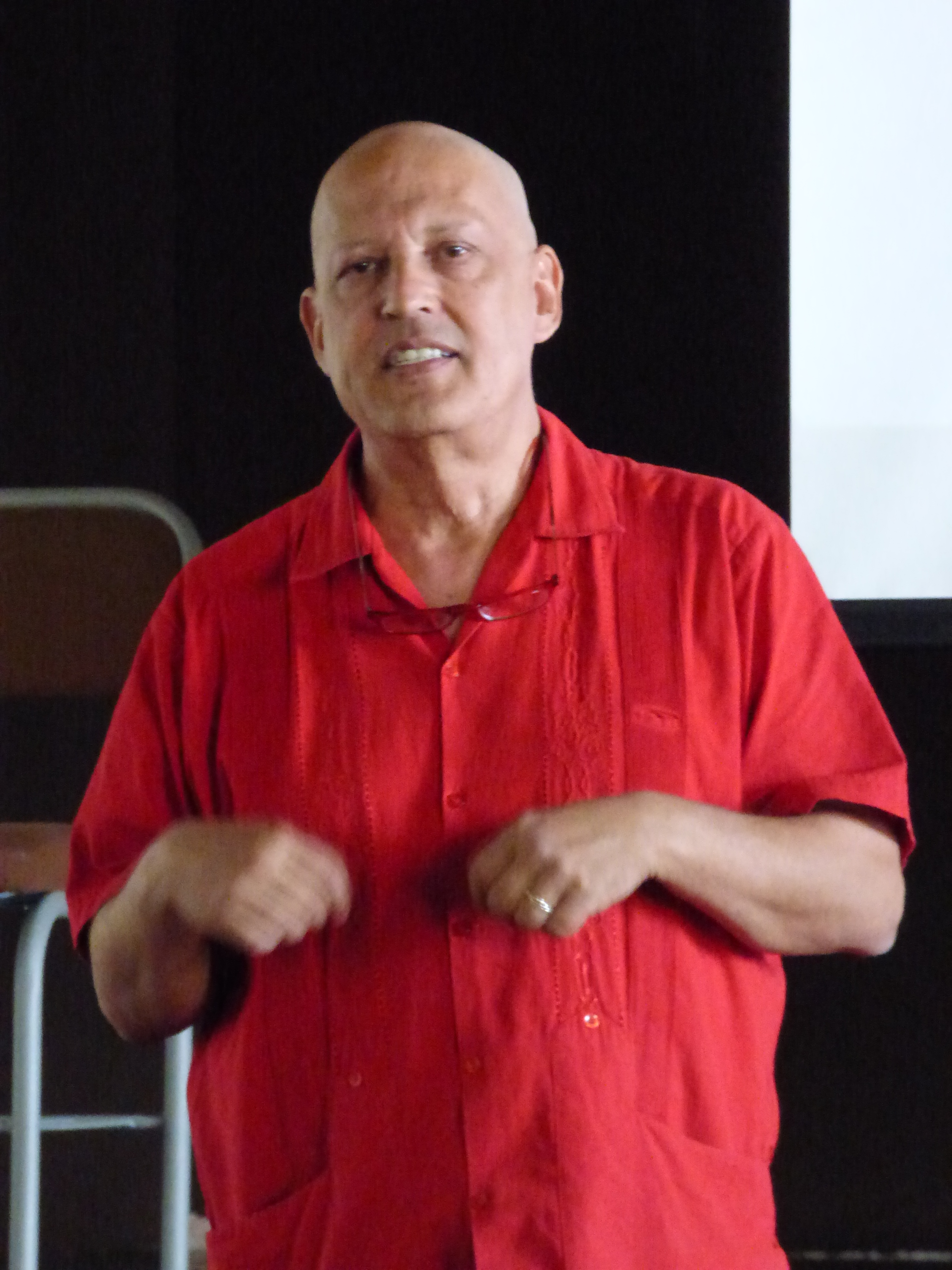
Álvarez in 2017. He originally composed Metro Chabacano as a present.

In November 1988, during a visit from his parents to one of his performances in London, they described one of the works performed as fast-paced and complex. Álvarez referred to that piece as a "piano and electroacustic piece", and three weeks before returning to Mexico, he created a first demo using a synthesizer. The piece was dedicated to his parents as a Christmas gift. Cellist Álvaro Bitrán, a member of the Cuarteto Latinoamericano who attended the gathering, suggested adapting the work for string quartet, but Álvarez wanted it to remain as a present.

In 1991, Mexican artist Marcos Límenes, a friend of Bitrán, requested permission to exhibit his kinetic sculptures at the Chabacano metro station. For the event, he asked to use Álvarez's composition "Canción de tierra y esperanza" (English: "Song of Earth and Hope"). Instead of presenting the gifted piece, Álvarez recomposed and retitled it Metro Chabacano. He invited the Cuarteto Latinoamericano to perform and record the new version. It was played live by the quartet at the exhibition's inauguration in September 1991. Álvarez later adapted it for string orchestra, and the composition has an average tempo of 144 to 146 beats per minute.

Álvarez also composed "Metro Nativitas" and "Metro Taxqueña" (named after Nativitas and Tasqueña metro stations, respectively). The three works were later compiled into a repertoire titled Línea 2, named after the metro line of the Mexico City Metro, along which the stations are located. Álvarez stated that he did not intend to replicate the metro system visually or sonically, but rather to evoke the experience of short, cyclical commutes. In 2021, Álvarez said he intended to compose a fourth piece titled "Metro Indios Verdes", named after Indios Verdes metro station, and to group the works under the title Cuatro estaciones ("Four Seasons"). (Note: A wordplay on "stations" and "seasons" in Spanish) He also explained that his interest in honoring metro stations was connected to his identity as a native of Mexico City, where several buildings were designed by his father, an architect.

Regarding Metro Chabacano, he explained it is structured around an ongoing eighth-note pulse at a steady, forward-moving pace, from which each instrument briefly steps forward with melodic material. Despite its brevity and single-movement form, the work features lively rhythmic shifts, accents, and melodic figures that animate the continuous motion beneath.

== Recordings ==
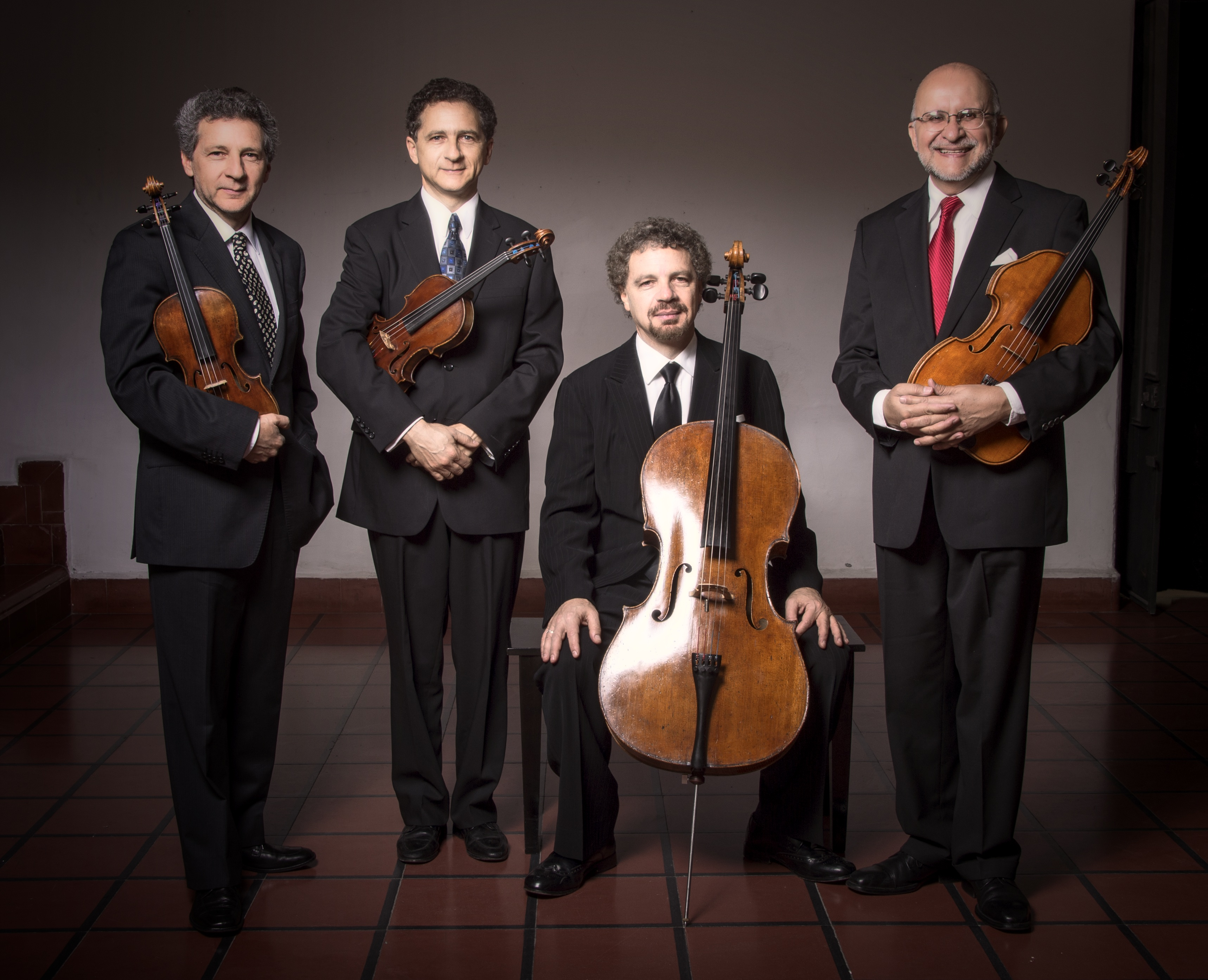
Cuarteto Latinoamericano in 2013. The quartet were the first to record Metro Chabacano.

Metro Chabacano has been played live in other subway stations, including in Los Angeles, United States, and Toronto, Canada. Other performances of the composition include those by Ahmed Dickinson with the Santiago Quartet, Alondra de la Parra, the Brodsky Quartet, Keri-Lynn Wilson, Camerata Romeu with Andreas Neufeld, the St. Lawrence String Quartet, and the Kaia Quartet.

== Critical reception ==
Jacques Sagot wrote for La Nación that Metro Chabacano converges with the pace of the station, at first with an "uninterrupted flow of repeated notes" and then with "whistles of the violin [evoking] the braking of the machine, the squeaking of the rubber [with] the arrival of the metro train". Writing for AllMusic, Joseph Stevenson described the piece as drawing on the minimalist style associated with John Adams, though he noted that this influence recedes at times due to the sustained use of counterpoint and faster, more varied harmonic movement. He also identified a Mexican character in the work's accent patterns and rhythmic displacement within its continuous eighth-note motion, comparing this quality to Carlos Chávez's Sinfonía india. Julian Haylock described the composition as "rhythmically seductive".

William Yeoman wrote for Gramophone described the musical piece as a "one-movement moto perpetuum". He also commented on the performance by Ahmed Dickinson and the Santiago Quartet that it helps to have "an ideal end to an enjoyable disc [Latin Perspective (2012)] that offers some respite from the heavy stuff without sacrificing artistry." James Crel for The Strad considered it a "propulsive but a bit monochrome" performance.

Live performances by the Cuarteto Latinoamericano and the Brodsky Quartet have received positive critical commentary.
