= Colonia Obrera =

Coordinates: 19°24′49.61″N 99°8′19.45″W

Obrera
- Neighborhood of Mexico City
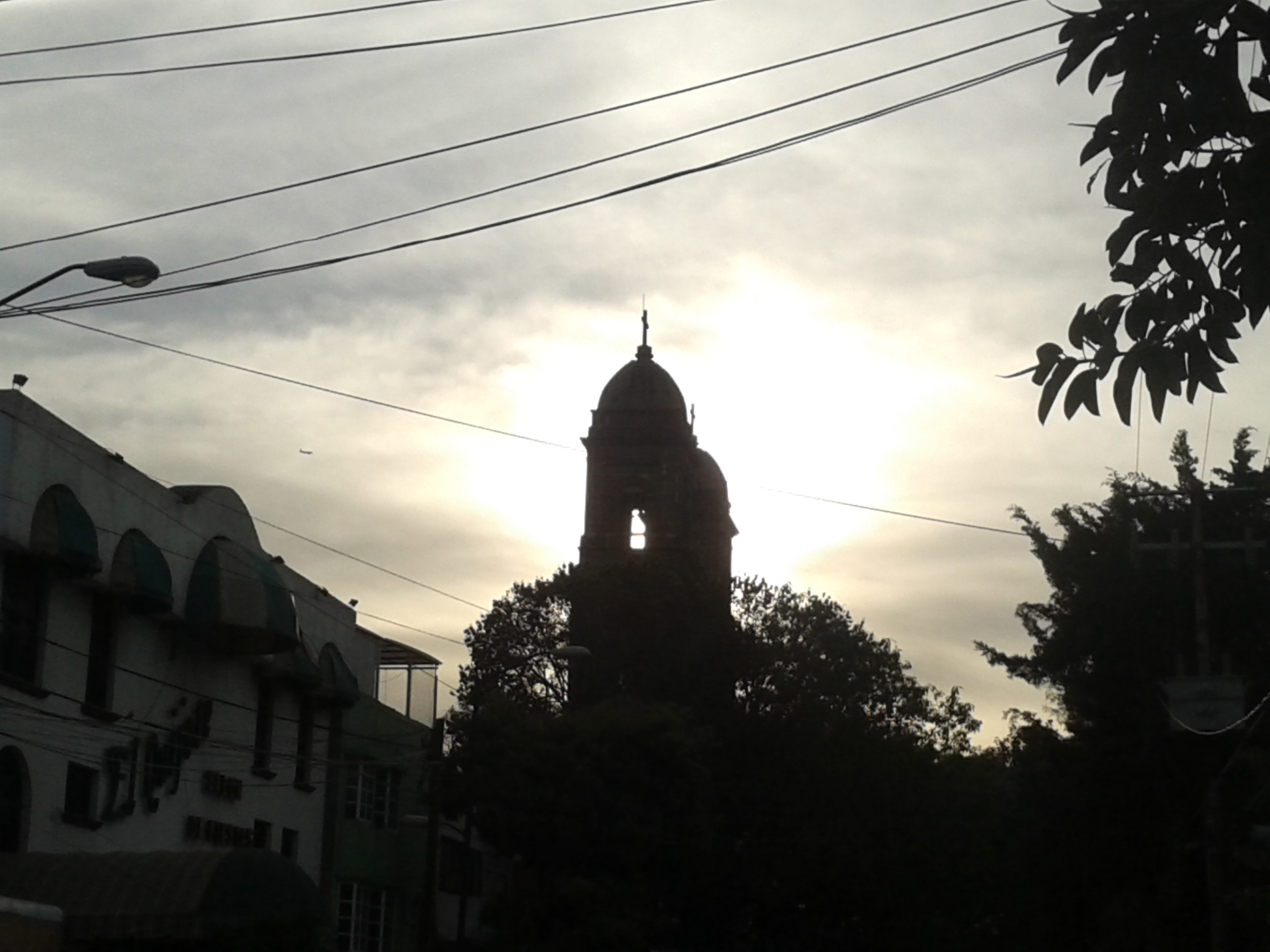
- Backlighting photograph of San José de los Obreros church

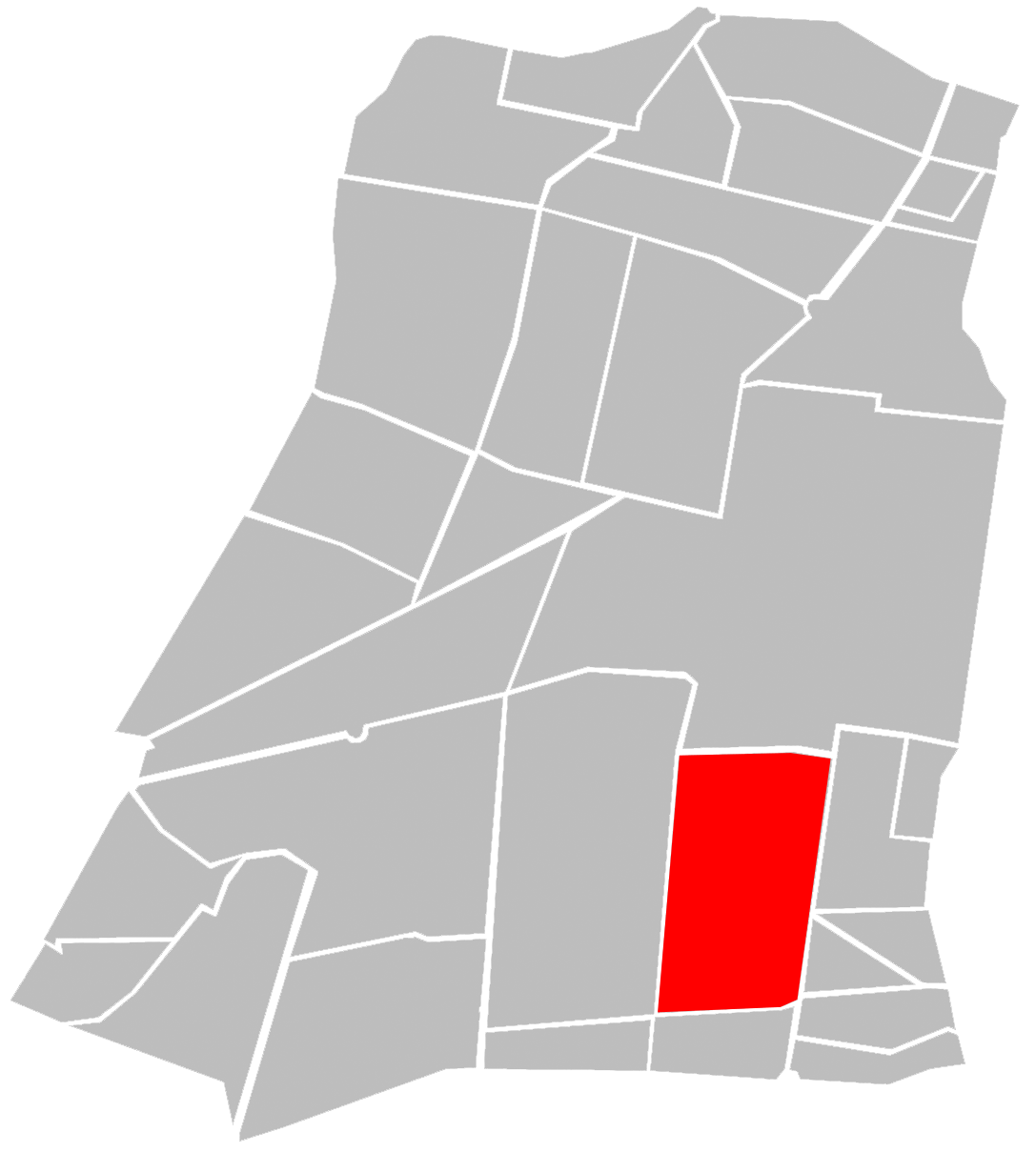
- Location of Colonia Obrera (in red) within Cuauhtémoc borough
- Country: Mexico
- City: Mexico City
- Borough: Cuauhtémoc

Population (2010)
  - Total: 35,224
- Postal code: 06800

Colonia Obrera is an administrative neighborhood of the borough of Cuauhtémoc in the center of Mexico City. It was established in the late 19th and early 20th centuries and became home to many artisans and industrial workmen. Up to the early 1980s, a number of sewing factories were still located here, but the 1985 Mexico City earthquake destroyed many, including the Topeka factory in which many of the seamstresses died inside. Today, the area has a high crime rate but there have been efforts to revitalize it.

== Location ==
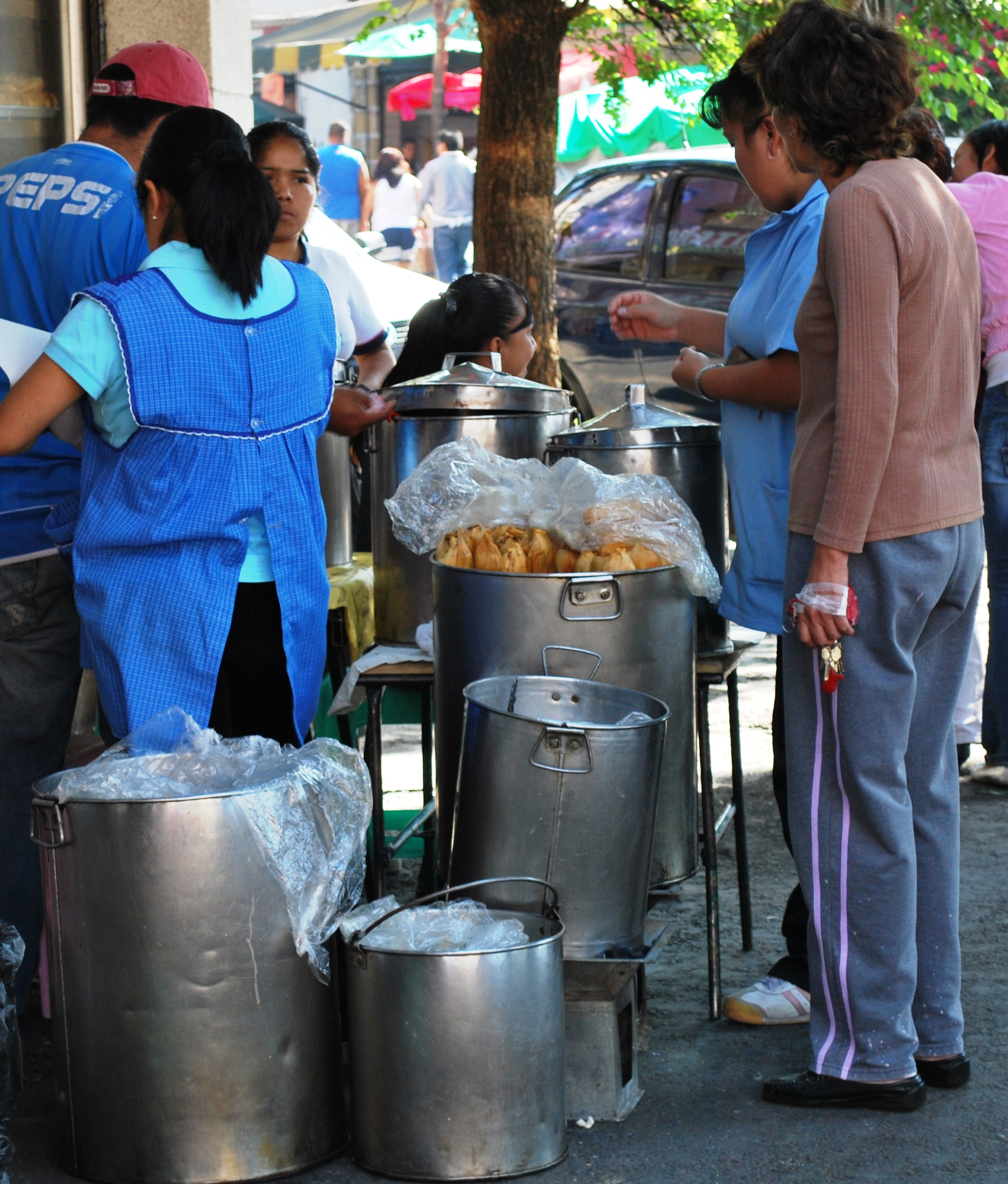
Buying and selling tamales in the neighborhood

The neighborhood is bounded by Chimalpopoca Street to the north, Eje Central to the west, San Antonio Abad to the east and Eje Tres Contreras to the south. In addition to the streets that define its borders, other major streets include the elongations of 5 de Febrero, Isabel la Catolica and Bolivar south from the historic center. Major east-west roads include Boturini, Manuel J.Othon, Manuel Payno and Jose Maria Roa Barcenas.

== History ==
The project to create the neighborhood was announced in 1889, with the original name of El Cuartelito. It was laid out and lots were sold before official authorization or municipal services were established. Many of the lots created here were acquired by artisans. Efforts to make the lands legal and to install municipal services began around the same time. By 1920, the colonia had taken on its modern form and a canal which used to drain the area was dried out and covered over to make José T. Cuellar Street. Around this time was built the Santiago Galas building, which was the station for the FF.CC. Mexico Tlalpan rail line for many years.

In the first decades of the 20th century, it was one of the most important neighborhoods as industrialization took hold in the city. During this time period, many artisans, semi-skilled and skilled labor were organizing into unions. In this neighborhood brothers Ricardo and Enrique Flores Magón organized the Partido Liberal Mexicano. They also published a newspaper called Regeneración beginning in 1900.

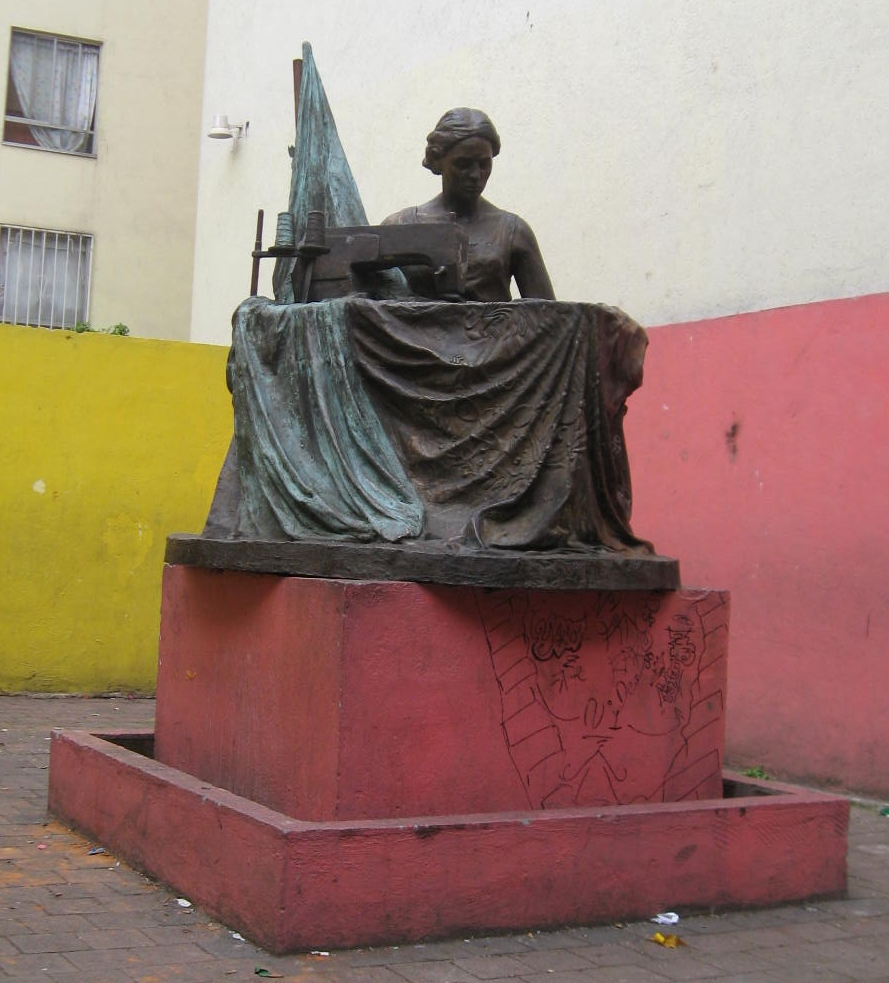
Bronze statue at corner of Manuel J Othón and San Antonio Abad at site of collapsed factory

Up until the 1980s, the northeast of this neighborhood had a number of sewing factories, especially near station San Antonio Abad. During the 1985 Mexico City earthquake, a number of these were destroyed. One in particular, called “Topeka” was located on Manuel José Othón Street and was the scene of many deaths. The magazine Proceso reports that by the time rescue workers got to the building, the owners were already in a hurry to demolish it, without trying to rescue or recover the seamstresses that were trapped inside. About 150 bodies of workers had already been pulled from the wreckage by other workers with their bare hands. The collapse of this factory exposed the deplorable conditions that many of these seamstresses were subject to. The building that collapsed, as well as many others, were found to be decrepit. It came to be known that many of these women had to work extended hours with little or no compensation, and few, if any of the labor laws on the books were being followed. This event made the garment industry of the area a labor embarrassment. All that is left to remind of the factory is a small empty lot with a bronze statue of a woman sewing to commemorate the event. On the rest of the property, apartments have been built.

== Crime and efforts to renew the area ==
The colonia is located in the borough of Cuauhtémoc, which has some of the highest crime rates in the city the same as Tepito, one of the notorious places for being unsafe. Obrera is listed in the top ten as far as crimes reported, which include small scale drug trafficking and indigence. Young architects from Mexico City, participating in the XI International Architecture Show in Italy, proposed a project for this area based on the philosophy of recycling of urban land. Their project was sponsored by the Consejo Nacional para la Cultura y las Artes and the Instituto Nacional de Bellas Artes. The goal of this project was to convert older industrial and warehouse space into 5,000 new living quarters, centered on Ixtapaluca Street.

== Transportation ==
=== Public transportation ===
The area is served by the Mexico City Metro.

Metro stations

- Obrera
- San Antonio Abad
- Chabacano

== See also ==
- List of the names of the streets of Colonia Obrera (in Spanish Wikipedia)
