= Lázaro Cárdenas metro station (Mexico City) =

Mexico City metro station

Lázaro Cárdenas
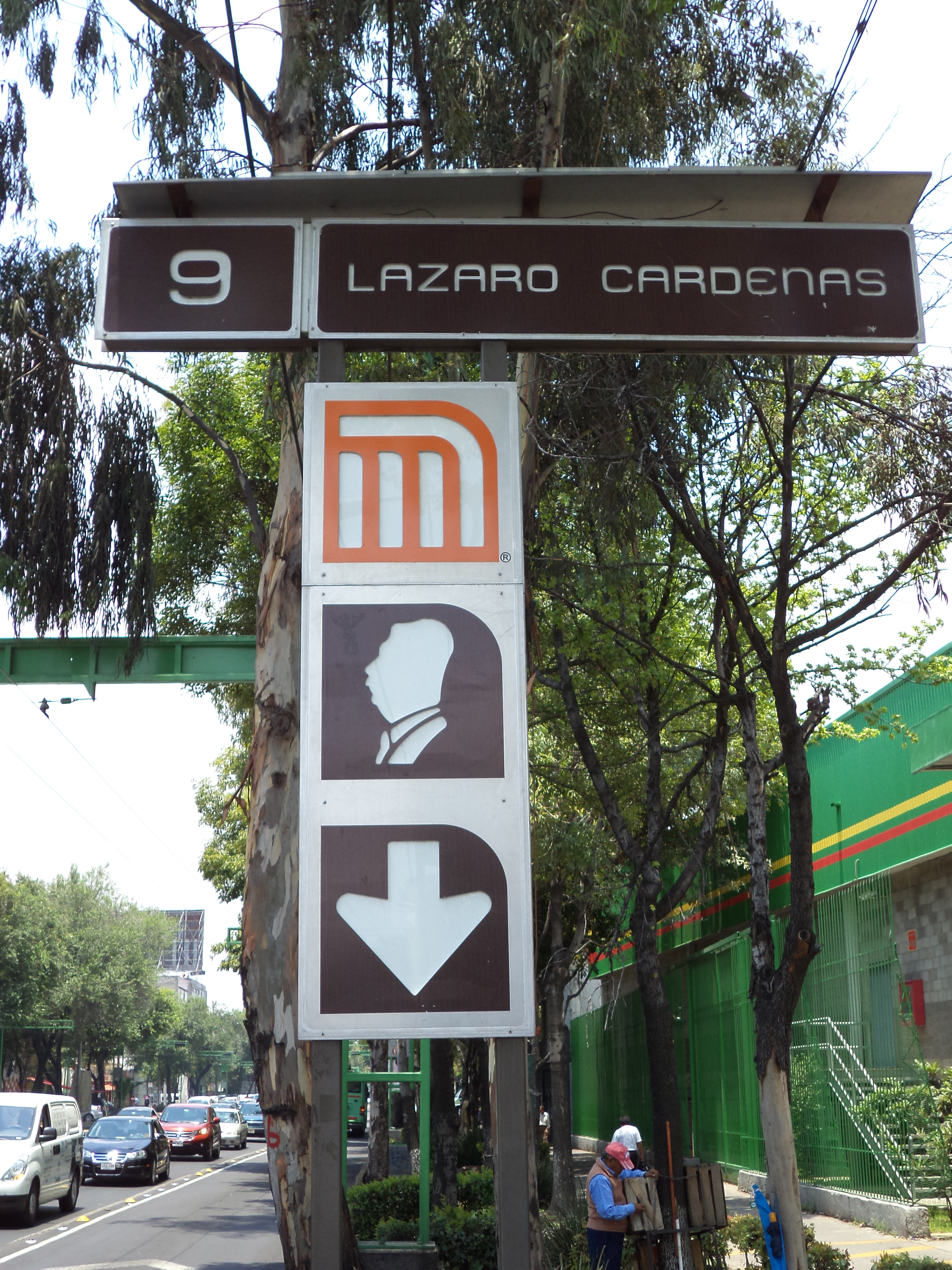

General information
- Location: Mexico City; Mexico
- Coordinates: 19°24′25″N 99°08′42″W
- System: Mexico City Metro
- Platforms: 2 side platforms
- Tracks: 2

Construction
- Structure type: Underground

Other information
- Status: In service

History
- Opened: 26 August 1987; 38 years ago

Passengers
- 2025: 3,806,031 (Note: The data here is limited to the most recent ten years to avoid excessive listings; earlier figures can be found in this page's history or on the Mexico City Metro website. To calculate the average daily ridership, the annual total is divided by 365 days (366 in leap years), with decimals omitted from the result. Each station per line is ranked individually, as the system counts transfer stations separately. The percentage change is calculated automatically using the data from the current year and the previous year.) ▲16.98%
- Rank: 137/195

Services
Preceding station	Mexico City Metro	Following station
Centro Médico toward Tacubaya	Line 9	Chabacano toward Pantitlán
Route map
Location
- Location within Mexico City
- Area map

Lázaro Cárdenas (Spanish: Estación Lázaro Cárdenas) is on Line 9 of the Mexico City Metro System between Metro Centro Médico and Metro Chabacano at the intersection of Eje Central and Eje 3 Sur. It links to the Eje Central Trolebus line.

== Name and iconography ==
The station is named after Lázaro Cárdenas, and the station logo shows a portrait in profile of him.

== History ==
From 23 April to 21 June 2020, the station was temporarily closed due to the COVID-19 pandemic in Mexico.

== Ridership ==
Annual passenger ridership
Year	Ridership	Average daily	Rank	% change	Ref.
2025	3,806,031	10,427	137/195	+16.98%
2024	3,253,621	8,889	138/195	−16.54%
2023	3,898,433	10,680	113/195	+0.43%
2022	3,881,639	10,634	113/195	+31.51%
2021	2,951,608	8,086	112/195	+27.53%
2020	2,314,486	6,323	144/195	−46.96%
2019	4,363,376	11,954	141/195	−0.51%
2018	4,385,713	12,015	137/195	+1.02%
2017	4,341,319	11,894	136/195	−5.11%
2016	4,574,899	12,499	131/195	+0.10%

== Gallery ==
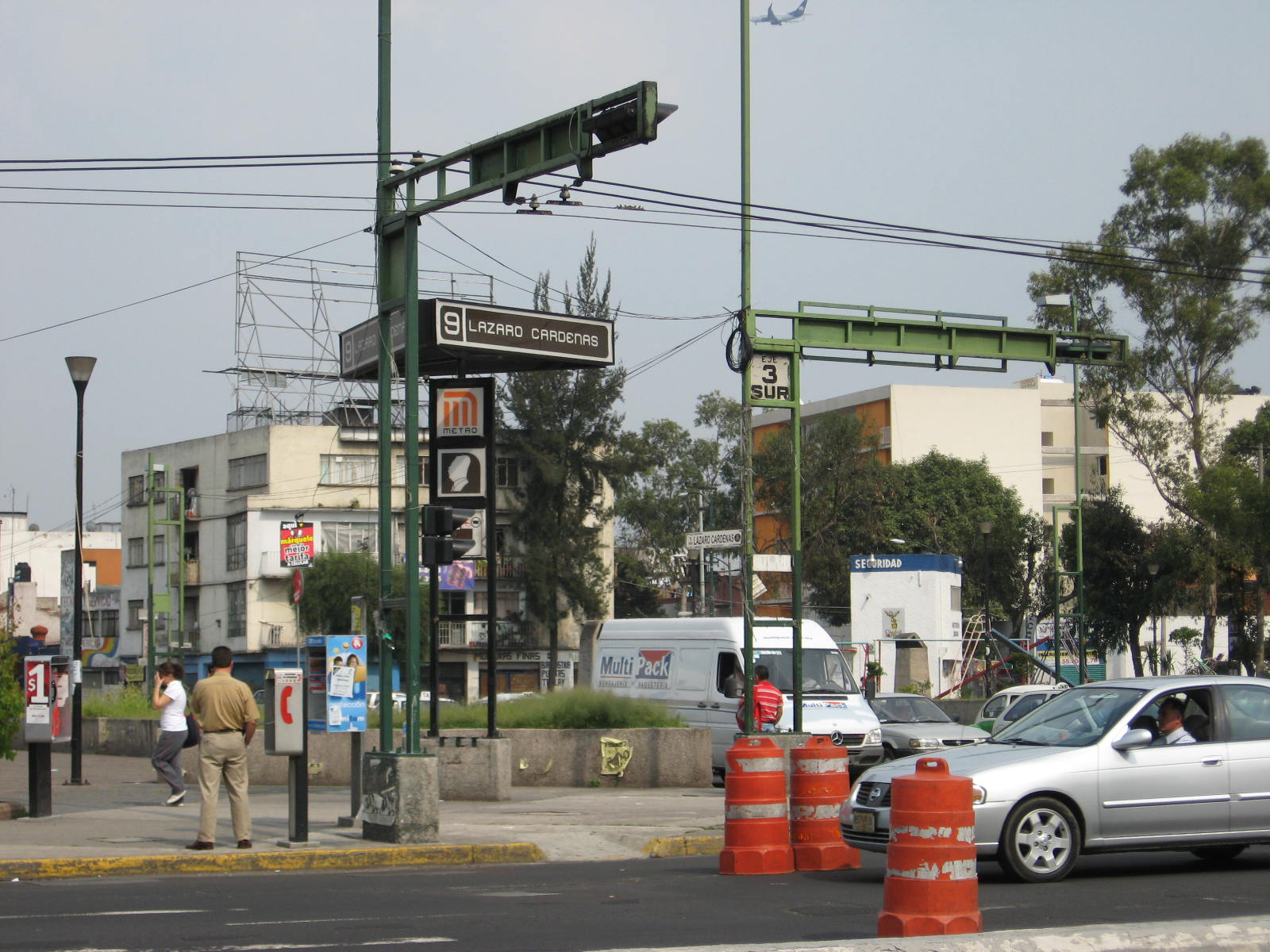
Station entrance, 25 August 2008
