= San Antonio Abad metro station =

Mexico City metro station

San Antonio Abad
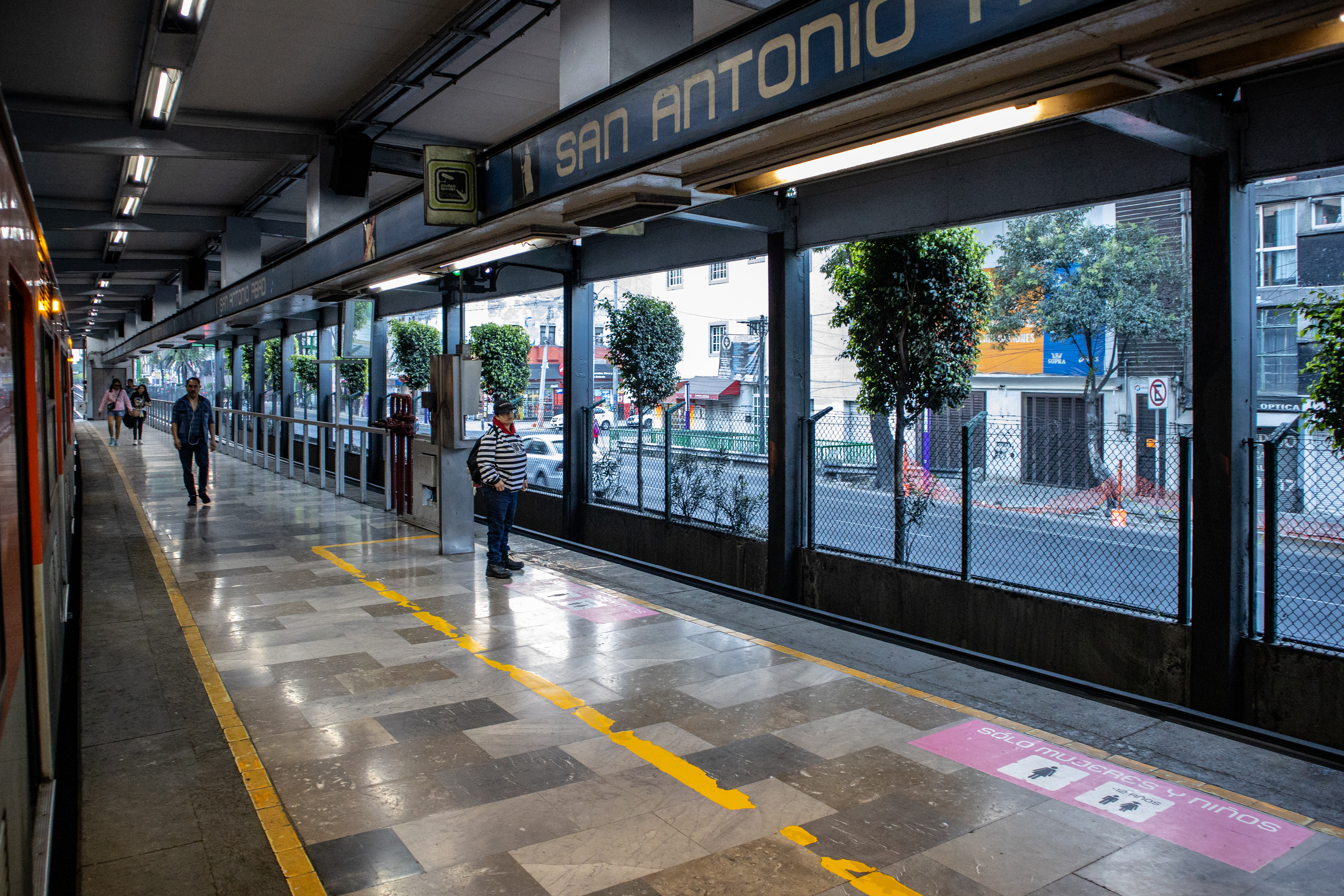
- Metro station San Antonio Abad in 2025

General information
- Location: Av. San Antonio Abad; Cuauhtémoc; Mexico City; Mexico
- Coordinates: 19°25′07″N 99°08′03″W
- System: Mexico City Metro
- Platforms: 1 island platform
- Tracks: 2

Construction
- Structure type: At grade
- Platform levels: 1
- Parking: No
- Cycle facilities: No
- Accessible: Yes

Other information
- Status: In service

History
- Opened: 1 August 1970; 56 years ago
- Rebuilt: 2026

Passengers
- 2025: 5,894,246 (Note: The data here is limited to the most recent ten years to avoid excessive listings; earlier figures can be found in this page's history or on the Mexico City Metro website. To calculate the average daily ridership, the annual total is divided by 365 days (366 in leap years), with decimals omitted from the result. Each station per line is ranked individually, as the system counts transfer stations separately. The percentage change is calculated automatically using the data from the current year and the previous year.) ▼6.29%
- Rank: 82/195

Services
| Preceding station | Mexico City Metro | Following station |
|---|---|---|
| Pino Suárez toward Cuatro Caminos | Line 2 | Chabacano toward Tasqueña |
Route map
Location
- Location within Mexico City
- Area map

San Antonio Abad is a station on Line 2 of the Mexico City Metro system. It is located in the Colonia Tránsito and Colonia Obrera neighborhoods of the Cuauhtémoc borough of Mexico City, to the south of the city centre, in the median of Calzada San Antonio Abad.

== General information ==
The station logo depicts Saint Anthony the Great, after the monastery dedicated to him that was established in the area after the Spanish conquest of Tenochtitlán. The section of the avenue on which the station sits is also called after him, but due south it later becomes the Calzada de Tlalpan.

Metro San Antonio Abad is the first street-level station on the southern section of Line 2. The station opened on 1 August 1970.

=== Ridership ===
Annual passenger ridership
| Year | Ridership | Average daily | Rank | % change | Ref. |
|---|---|---|---|---|---|
| 2025 | 5,894,24 | 16,148 | 82/195 | −6.29% |
| 2024 | 6,289,623 | 17,184 | 66/195 | +2.81% |
| 2023 | 6,117,960 | 16,761 | 74/195 | +12.22% |
| 2022 | 5,451,709 | 14,936 | 78/195 | +54.30% |
| 2021 | 3,533,270 | 9,680 | 86/195 | −22.75% |
| 2020 | 4,573,597 | 12,496 | 72/195 | −42.09% |
| 2019 | 7,897,611 | 21,637 | 79/195 | +16.33% |
| 2018 | 6,788,829 | 18,599 | 93/195 | −19.69% |
| 2017 | 8,453,384 | 23,159 | 65/195 | −4.66% |
| 2016 | 8,866,883 | 24,226 | 61/195 | +0.64% |

== Exits ==
- East: Avenida San Antonio Abad and Manuel Gutiérrez Nájera street, Colonia Tránsito
- West: Avenida San Antonio Abad between Manuel M. Flores street and José Joaquín Arriaga street, Colonia Obrera

== See also ==
- List of Mexico City metro stations
