= Colonia Paulino Navarro =

Coordinates: 19°24′41.6″N 99°7′45.93″W

Colonia Paulino Navarro is a colonia or neighborhood in the Cuauhtémoc borough of Mexico City, just southeast of the city’s historic center. Its boundaries are defined by the following streets: Ventura G. Tena and Hernández y Dávalos to south, Calzada de la Chabacano to the north, Calzada de la Viga to the east and Calzada de San Antonio Abad to the west.

The origins of the neighborhood date from 1905, when Iñigo Noriega proposed urbanizing what was then called Colonia La Paz. Plans for the construction of housing subdivisions were approved by the city in 1907, forming streets and blocks, but it did not officially establish the administrative division of colonia. The project then stalled. In 1913, the Agrícola y Colonizadora Mexicana Company proposed a similar project, but this, too, ran into problems. By 1920, there were houses and blocks but only semi-organized, with houses and other properties encroaching on other private properties and colonias.

Colonia La Paz was a rather large area with eventually broke off into several smaller colonias. Paulino Navarro broke off by 1920 from the center of La Paz, which is now called Colonia Asturias. Around the same time, the first houses were built on the drying lakebed in this area, as well as the roads of Calzada de San Esteban, known today as Calzada del Chabacano and other major roads such as Eje 3 José Peón Contreras.

Today the colonia is still almost entirely residential with mostly working-class families.(delegacion) All of the schools in the colonia are public and include Papaloapan Prescool and several primary schools, all with the name of Quetzalcoatl.
