= Colonia Asturias =

Coordinates: 19°24′16.82″N 99°8′2.15″W

Asturias
- Neighborhood of Mexico City
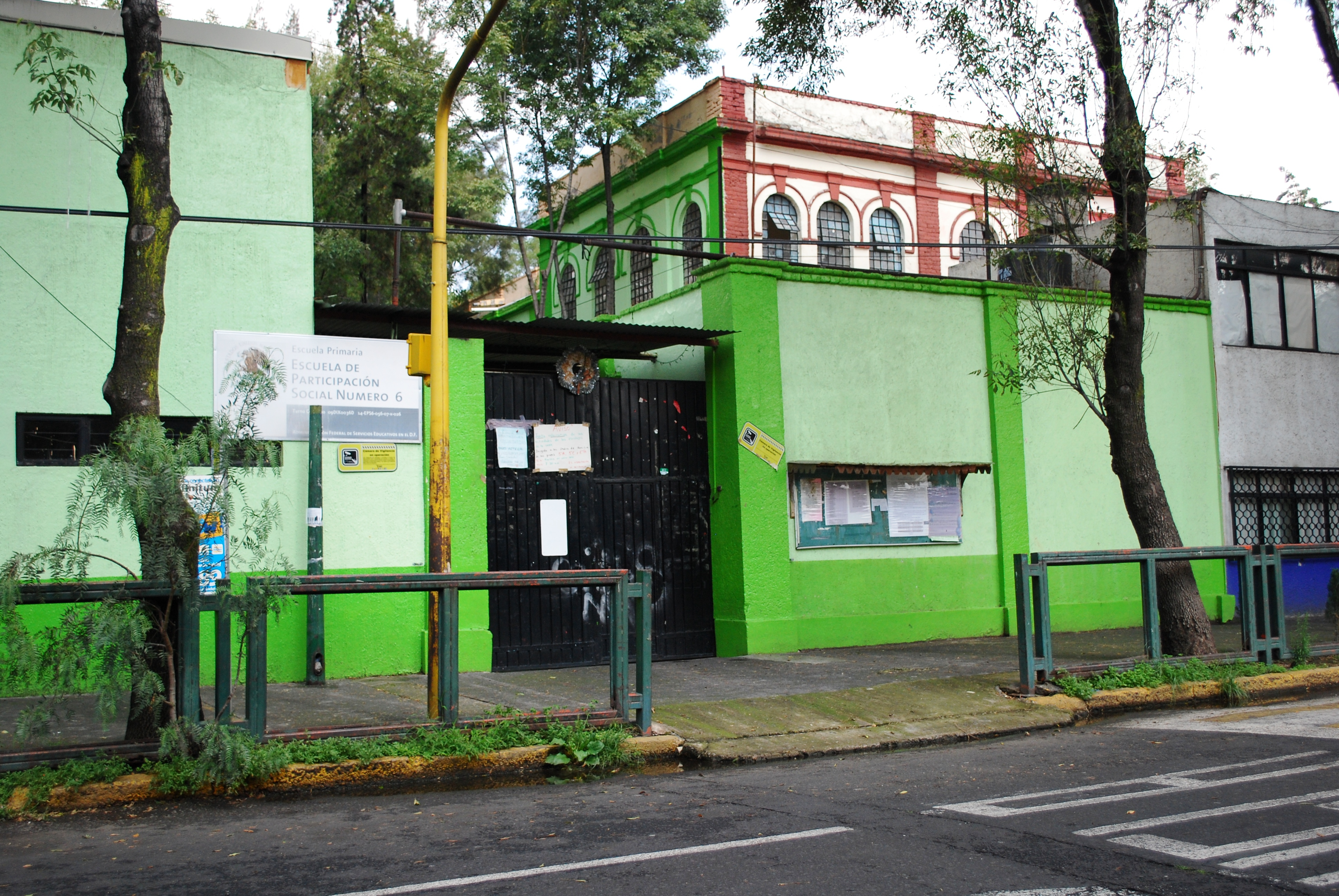
- Escuela de Participación Social Número 6

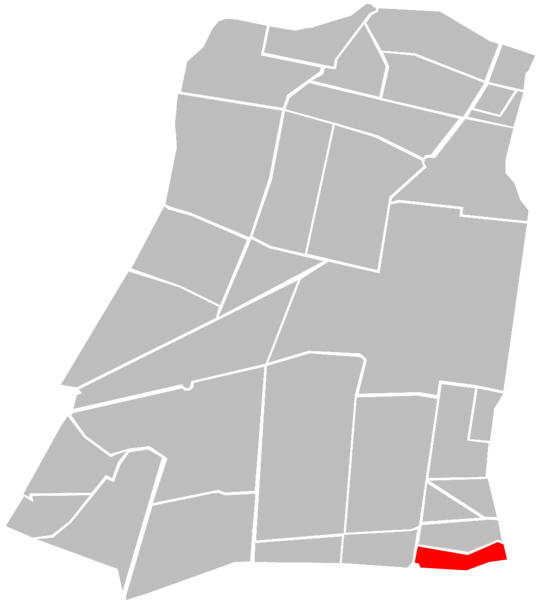
- Location of Colonia Asturias (in red) within Cuauhtémoc borough
- Country: Mexico
- City: Mexico City
- Borough: Cuauhtémoc

Population (2010)
  - Total: 4,364
- Postal code: 06850

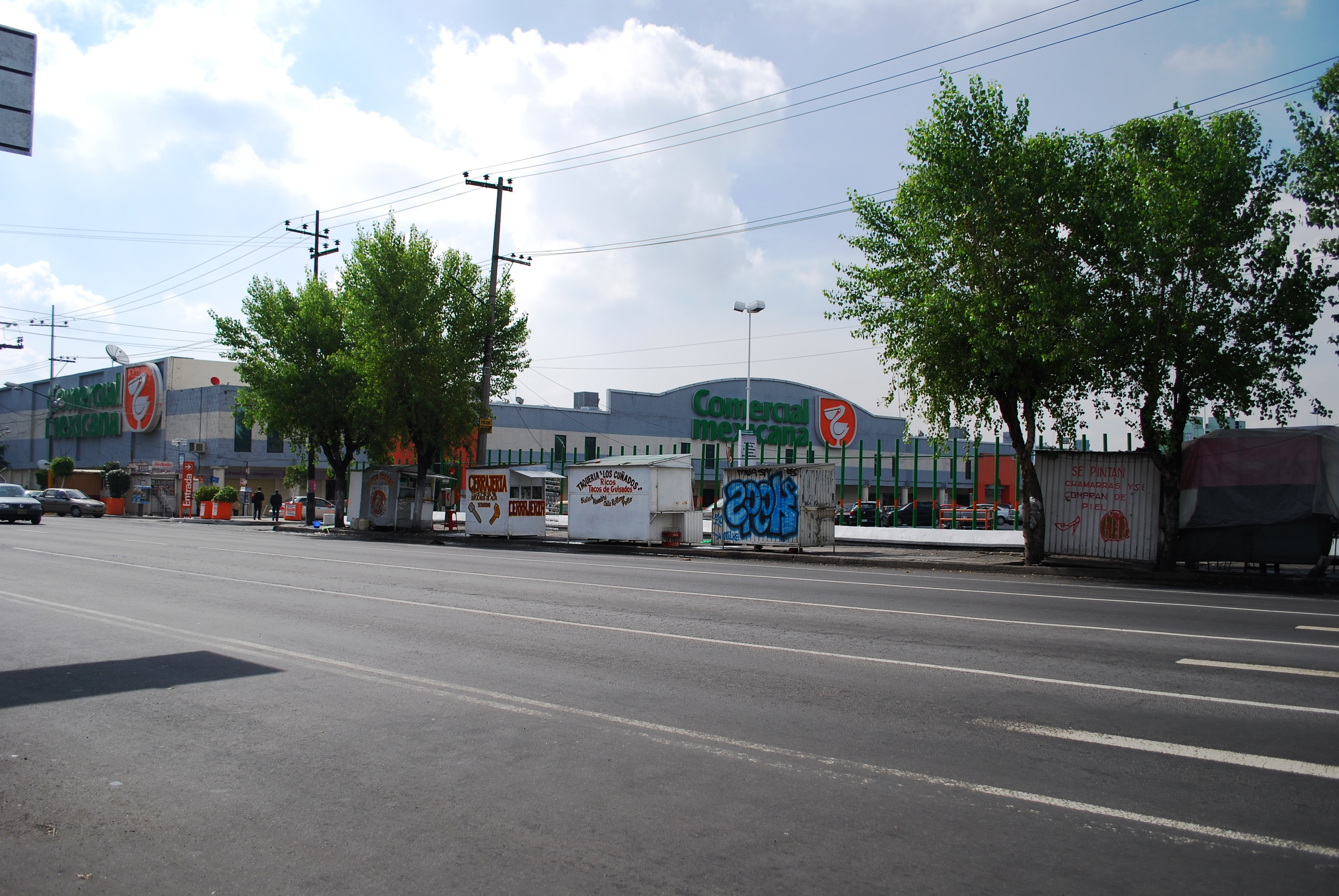
Comercial Mexicana market where the football stadium used to be

Colonia Asturias is a colonia or neighborhood in the Cuauhtémoc borough, south of the historic center of Mexico City. It is a lower-class residential neighborhood, whose borders are formed by the following streets, Calles Hernández y Dávalos in the north, Viaducto Piedad in the south, Calzada de la Viga in the east and Calzada San Antonio Abad in the west.

== Description ==
The neighborhood is named after Parque Asturias, a football stadium constructed in the area by the Centro Asturiano de México, which existed on the corner of Calzada de Chabacano and José Antonio Torres street. The field was built in 1936 and had a seating capacity of 25,000 spectators, and was the first major football field in the history of the city. The first game held in the stadium was between a Brazilian team (Botafogo) and the Asturianos team. A publicity stunt for the event had the ball for the game dropped onto the field by an airplane. This field no longer exists and has been the site of a supermarket since the 1970s.

== History ==
The origins of the neighborhood date from 1905, when Íñigo Noriega proposed the urbanization of what was then called Colonia La Paz.The plans for the construction of housing subdivisions were approved by the city in 1907, forming streets and blocks, but it did not officially establish the administrative division of colonia. The project then stalled. In 1913, the Agrícola y Colonizadora Mexicana Company proposed a similar project, but this, too, ran into problems. By 1920, there were houses and blocks but only semi-organized, with houses and other properties encroaching on other private properties and colonias. At this time, a large canal still ran through the area. To the side of this canal, the Cuauhtémoc borough decided to build a large road to the side it, which is Calzada de Chabacano. At this time, the La Piedad River on the south border was still open, but today it is encased entirely in a cement tube.

== Education ==
The neighborhood has three schools. Two are private:Centro de Educacion Especial y Rehabilitacion on Oriente Street and Colegio Americano Monarca on Ramon Fabie Street. There is one public primary school, Escuela de Participacion Social Num 6 on Jose Antonio Torres Street. This school is about 100 years old. While authorities try to conserve the building due to its historic and architectural value, its deteriorated condition has caused problems for school operations. Principal María Virginia Pérez stated in 2008, that major reconstruction work is needed, but the borough has not provided the needed monies. A number of local families have tried to contribute, but the school serves a mostly underprivileged community.

== Transportation ==
=== Public transportation ===
The area is served by the Mexico City Metro.

Metro stations:

- La Viga
- Chabacano
