= Javier Álvarez (composer) =

Mexican composer (1956–2023)

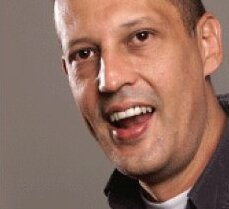
- Álvarez in 2002
- Born: Javier Álvarez Fuentes; 8 May 1956; Mexico City, Mexico
- Died: 23 May 2023 (aged 67); Mérida, Yucatán, Mexico
- Education: National Conservatory of Music (Mexico); University of Wisconsin–Milwaukee; City, University of London; Royal College of Music
- Occupations: Composer; Academic teacher
- Organizations: Guildhall School of Music and Drama; Malmö Academy of Music; University of Hertfordshire; Escuela Superior de Artes de Yucatán
- Awards: Premio Nacional de Ciencias y Artes; Medalla Bellas Artes; Medalla Mozart; Mendelssohn Scholarship
- Website: www.temazcal.co.uk

Javier Álvarez Fuentes (8 May 1956 – 23 May 2023) was a Mexican composer known for compositions that combined a variety of international musical styles and traditions, and that often utilized unusual instruments and new music technologies. Many of his works combine music technology with diverse instruments and influences from around the world. He taught internationally, in the UK and Sweden, and back in Mexico later in his career.

== Early life and education ==
Javier Álvarez was born in Mexico City on 8 May 1956 to the architect Augusto H. Álvarez and his wife, Delfina Fuentes Ogarrio. He attended school at the Escuela Moderna Americana, the Jesuit-run Instituto Patria, and the Lycée Franco-Mexicain.

At the age of 18 he entered the National Conservatory of Music, where he studied clarinet with Francisco Garduño and composition with Mario Lavista. He moved to the University of Wisconsin in Milwaukee where he achieved a master's degree in music theory and composition in 1981. He studied further in London, at the Royal College of Music with John Lambert and at the City University. He pursued a PhD sponsored by the Felix Mendelssohn Foundation, the Ralph Vaughan Williams Foundation and the London School of Economics. His first electroacoustic music dates from his student time in London, such as Temazcal in 1984.

== Career in music ==
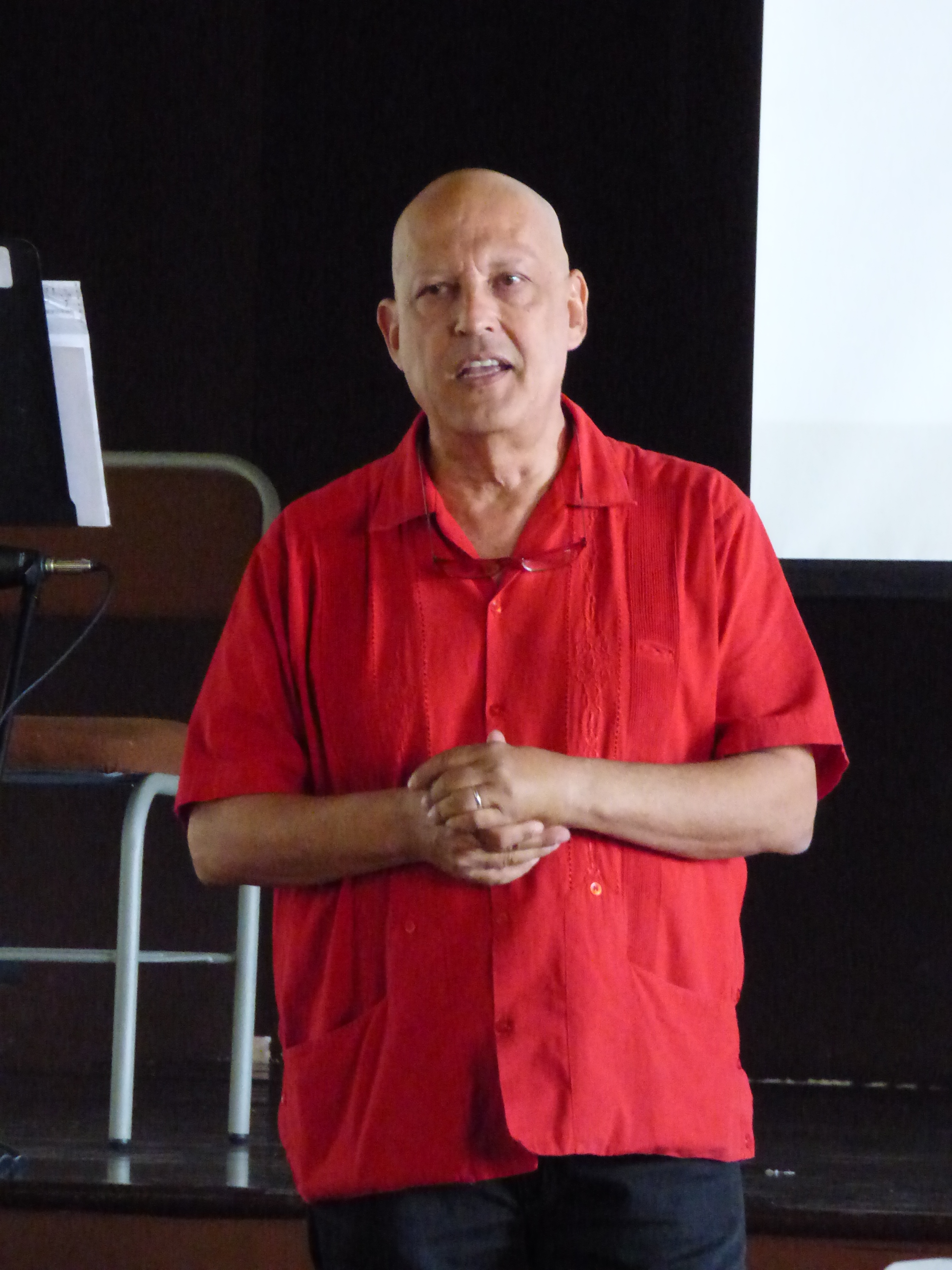
Álvarez speaking at the Autonomous University of Aguascalientes, 2017.

Several of Álvarez's works incorporate elements from Latin American dance genres, such as mambo. They have been performed throughout the world by orchestras such as the Chicago Symphony Orchestra, the London Sinfonietta, the Los Angeles Philharmonic, the Mexico City Philharmonic, and the Orchestre National de France. He composed the music for Guillermo del Toro's 1993 horror film Cronos.

From 1993 to 1999, Álvarez was a Fellow of Mexico's National Endowment for the Arts and Culture. He was a founding member of Sonic Arts Network and served as the artistic director of the Society for the Promotion of New Music in 1993. He was a member of the music faculties, teaching composition and computer music, of the City University London, the Guildhall School of Music and Drama, the Malmö Academy of Music, the Royal College of Music, and the University of Hertfordshire.

After living in England for 25 years, Álvarez returned to Mexico where he served as Dean of the Conservatorio de Las Rosas in Morelia, Michoacán. He then was a founding member of the musical arts department of the Escuela Superior de Artes de Yucatán in 2004, serving as its director from 2018. He resided in Mérida, Yucatán, where he was also active as a freelance composer and project animateur.

=== Compositions ===
The first electroacoustic music by Álvarez dates from his time as a student in London, such as Temazcal (1984). In this contemporary classic, Álvarez unexpectedly pitted a pair of maracas against a complex electroacoustic backdrop. Mannam (1992) takes its inspiration from an ancient Korean zither called a kayagum. Winner of a Prix Ars Electronica distinction, the piece blends and juxtaposes elements of Korean music with materials and performance techniques drawn from the Mexican folk harp. The work Offrande (2001) offers a mix of Caribbean steel pans and electronically processed rhythmic patterns.

Several of Álvarez's works incorporate elements from Latin American dance genres, such as mambo. In Mambo a la Braque (1991), he created an electroacoustic collage of musical segments drawn from Cuban mambo composer Dámaso Pérez Prado's Caballo Negro.

According to the listing at IRCAM, his works include:

- Solo and chamber works
  - Ki Bone Gaku (1984) – trombone and marimba 12'
  - Lluvia de Toritos (1984) – solo flute 9'
  - Chaconna (1991) – viola and harpsichord 5'
  - Ayara (1981) – bassoon and string quartet 22'
  - Caracteristicas (1982) – flute, oboe, cello, and piano 9'
  - Tientos (1985) – flute (piccolo), clarinet, violin, cello, and piano 11'
  - Quemar las Naves (1988-rev91) – soprano sax, trumpet, trombone, bass guitar, piano, drums, and hand percussion 15'
  - Metro Chabacano (1991) – string quartet 7'
  - Acordeón de Roto Corazón (1994) – saxophone quartet 7'
  - Metro Taxqueña (1994) – string quartet 8'
  - Serpiente y Escalera (1995) – cello and piano 10'
  - Metro Nativitas (1999) – string quartet 8'
  - Nocturno y Toque (1997) – 2 steel pans and 2 marimbas 13'
  - Modelo para Armar (2000) – saxophone ensemble, 2 baroque guitars, and 2 percussion. 15'
  - Estudio # 5 (2002) – tenor steel pan 7'
  - n mambo (2001) – piano 3'
  - Triple enclave (2004) – piano 7'
  - Trompatufarria al Pastor (2005) – French horn quartet 4'
- Large chamber ensembles
  - Recintos (1981) – wind ensemble 24'
  - Metro Chabacano (1987) – string orchestra 7'
  - Mantis Walk in Metal Space (2003) – percussion soloist, instrumental ensemble (flute, 2 clarinets, 2 French horns, 2 trombones, tuba, piano, 2 violins, cello and double bass), real time electronics and electroacoustic sounds 20'
  - Metal de Corazones (2012) – instrumental ensemble (tpt, clarinet, bass clarniet, violin, viola, cello, piano, percussion, and percussion quartet) 15'
- Soloist and orchestra
  - Trireme (1983) – French horn and orchestra 18'
  - Música para piel y palangana (1993) – percussion and orchestra 23'
  - Geometría Foliada (2002) – string quartet and orchestra 19'
  - Jardines con Palmera (2012) – percussion and orchestra 12'
  - La Ceiba de Sol y Luna (2013) – bassoon and orchestra 18'
- Orchestra
  - Gramática de Dos (1991) – 14'
- Voice and instruments
  - Canciones de la Venta (1977) – soprano, violin, viola, and Mexican jarana or baroque guitar; text in Spanish by Jose Carlos Becerra 8'
  - Tres ranas contra reloj (1981) – soprano (col), violin, cello, and piano (vocalise) 17'
  - Fragmentos de Hueso (1984) – soprano, flute, soprano sax, bass clarinet, and viola; text in Nahuatl and English 9'
  - Animal Crackers (1990) – 2 sopranos and baritone, viola and piano; text in English by Jo Shapcott 9'
  - Días como Sombra (2010) – 2 sopranos, alto and baritone, and percussion quartet
- Choir and ensemble / orchestra
  - Te espera esa Chispa (1982)
  - Calacas Imaginarias (1994)
  - Amor es mas Laberinto (1978)
  - Días como Sombra (2010) – SATB choir and percussion quartet
- Opera
  - Mambo (1989–2001)
- Electroacoustic
  - Temazcal (1984) – amplified maracas and electroacoustic sounds 8'
  - The Panama Files (1986) – electroacoustic sounds 4' (in collaboration with Ian Dearden)
  - Papalotl (1987) – piano and electroacoustic sounds 13'
  - Edge Dance (1987) – electroacoustic sounds 3' (in collaboration with Ian Dearden)
  - On going on (1987) – baritone saxophone and electroacoustic sounds 11'
  - Asi el acero (1988) – amplified tenor steelpan and electroacoustic sounds 9'
  - Acuerdos por Diferencia (1989) – harp and electroacoustic sounds 12'
  - Mambo à la Braque (1990) – electroacoustic sounds 3'
  - Shekere (2001) – shekere gourd, and live control system 10'
  - Mannam (1992) – kayagum (Korean zither) and electroacoustic sounds 14'
  - Mambo Vinko (1993) – trombone and electroacoustic sounds 15'
  - Pyramid (1996) – any number of instruments and electroacoustic sounds 5–8'
  - Calacas Imaginarias (1994)
  - Overture (1995) – electroacoustic sounds 1'
  - Offrande (2000) – tenor and baritone steel pans and electroacoustic sounds 18'
  - Recycle loops (2002) – for young percussion players and electroacoustic sounds
  - Cylinder clouds (2002) – installation for three flutes and electroacoustic sounds 24'
  - Cactus Geometries (2002) – electroacoustic sounds 19'
  - Le repas du Serpent & Retour à la Raison (2004) – cello, video, and electroacoustic sounds 9'
  - Negro Fuego y Cruzado (2008) – two bass clarinets, video, and electroacoustic sounds 11'
  - De tus manos brotan pájaros (2010) – bassoon and electroacoustic sounds 13'
- Film and dance
  - Cronos (aka The Cronos Device, La Invención de Cronos) – Feature directed by Guillermo del Toro. Produced by Iguana Producciones and Ventana Films. Mexico and Los Angeles 1992. Prix de la critique, Cannes 1993.
  - TID-TUG – Animation directed by William Latham. Produced by the Royal College of Art, London 1985.
  - The Empire of Form – Computer animation by Latham. Produced by the Royal College of Art, London 1987.
  - Appearance – Composed for Sue Maclennan and Dancers. London. Commissioned by the Arts Council of Great Britain and produced by Sue Maclennan and Dancers and Chisenhale Dance Space. London. 1988.

=== Recordings ===
The chamber music work with electroacoustics Temazcal was recorded in 2003 by Powerplant, a group dominated by percussionist Joby Burgess, together with other pieces including Steve Reich's Electric Counterpoint. The chamber music work Metro Chabacano was recorded in 2012 by guitarist Ahmed Dickinson Cárdenas and the Santiago Quartet, in a collection of Latin America music for the ensemble. Reviewer Yeoman from Gramophone described it as a "hypnotic one-movement moto perpetuum".

=== Awards ===
Álvarez received numerous prizes and honors including a Mendelssohn Scholarship in 1986, the Lionel Robbins Award, a Gemini Fellowship, the ICEM Prize in 1987 and an award at the Bourges International Festival, Austria's Prix Ars Electronica several times, in 1993 for Mannam. In Mexico, he was awarded the Medalla Mozart, the Premio Nacional de Ciencias y Artes in 2013, and the INBA's Medalla Bellas Artes in 2015. In 2014, he became a member of the Academia de Artes.

== Personal life and death ==
Álvarez was married; he and his wife Daniela had a boy and a girl.

Álvarez died in Mérida on 23 May 2023, at age 67. Alejandra Frausto, the federal Secretary of Culture, credited him as a "musician and composer who never stopped creating, proposing and working for his community and for his beloved Mérida".
