= Ji-Hae Park =

South Korean violinist

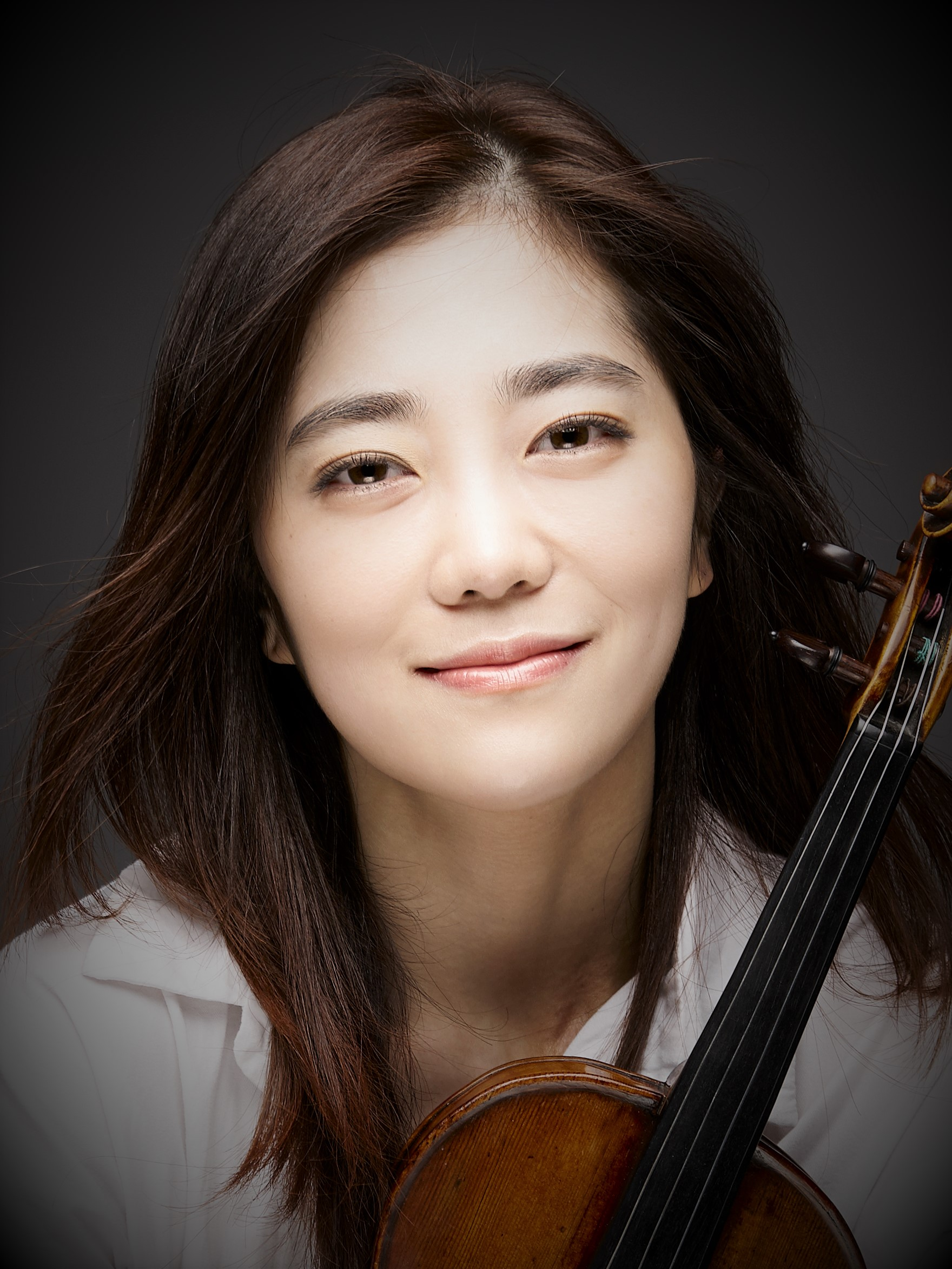

Background information
- Born: 1985 (age 40–41); Germany
- Origin: Seoul, South Korea
- Genres: classical
- Occupations: violinist, professor, video producer
- Instrument: violin
- Website: www.jihaepark.com

Korean name
- Hangul: 박지혜
- RR: Bak Jihye
- MR: Pak Chihye

Ji-Hae Park is a German-born South Korean violinist, professor, and entrepreneur born in 1985.

== Biography ==
In 2003, Park became a student of Ulf Hoelscher at the Karlsruhe University of Music and received a scholarship.

In 2011, Park gave a recital at Carnegie Hall's Zankel Hall.

In 2023, Park started an enterprise at the intersection of classical music and cyberspace. She has performed AI technologies, and has made her performances accessible in virtual concert halls.

In her free time, she is interested in ice hockey and was an honorary ambassador for the 2018 Winter Olympics in Pyeongchang.
