= La Viga metro station =

Mexico City metro station

La Viga
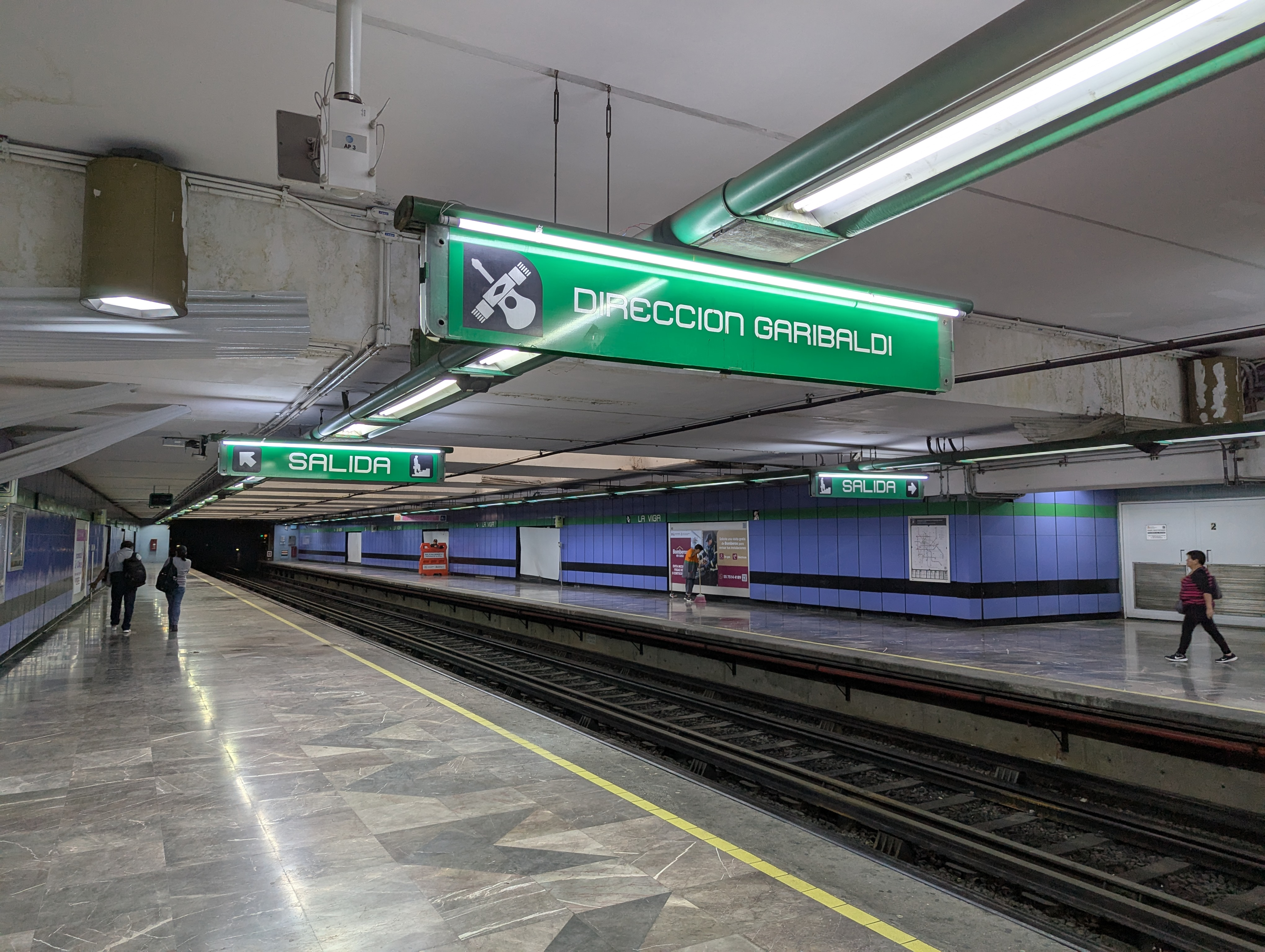
- Platform of the station (2025)

General information
- Coordinates: 19.406495°N 99.126248°W
- System: Mexico City Metro
- Platforms: 2 side platform
- Tracks: 2

Construction
- Structure type: Underground

History
- Opened: 20 July 1994

Passengers
- 2025: 2,287,007 (Note: The data here is limited to the most recent ten years to avoid excessive listings; earlier figures can be found in this page's history or on the Mexico City Metro website. To calculate the average daily ridership, the annual total is divided by 365 days (366 in leap years), with decimals omitted from the result. Each station per line is ranked individually, as the system counts transfer stations separately. The percentage change is calculated automatically using the data from the current year and the previous year.) ▼2.46%
- Rank: 169/195

Services
Preceding station	Mexico City Metro	Following station
Chabacano toward Garibaldi / Lagunilla	Line 8	Santa Anita toward Constitución de 1917
Route map
Location
- Location within Mexico City
- Area map

La Viga is a station along Line 8 of the metro of Mexico City.

The station's logo is a pair of fish since the neighborhood it serves (Colonia Jamaica) is home to Mercado de La Viga – one of the larger seafood markets in Mexico City.

From 23 April to 18 June 2020, the station was temporarily closed due to the COVID-19 pandemic in Mexico.

== Ridership ==
Annual passenger ridership
Year	Ridership	Average daily	Rank	% change	Ref.
2025	2,269,090	6,216	169/195	−2.46%
2024	2,326,313	6,356	160/195	+1.72%
2023	2,287,007	6,265	151/195	+6.53%
2022	2,146,807	5,881	149/195	+34.22%
2021	1,599,439	4,382	154/195	+17.94%
2020	1,356,163	3,705	176/195	−51.66%
2019	2,805,291	7,685	171/195	+6.46%
2018	2,635,022	7,219	173/195	+12.09%
2017	2,350,772	6,440	177/195	−8.71%
2016	2,575,023	7,035	173/195	+2.83%
