= Mexican Revolution =

Nationwide armed struggle in Mexico (1910–1920)

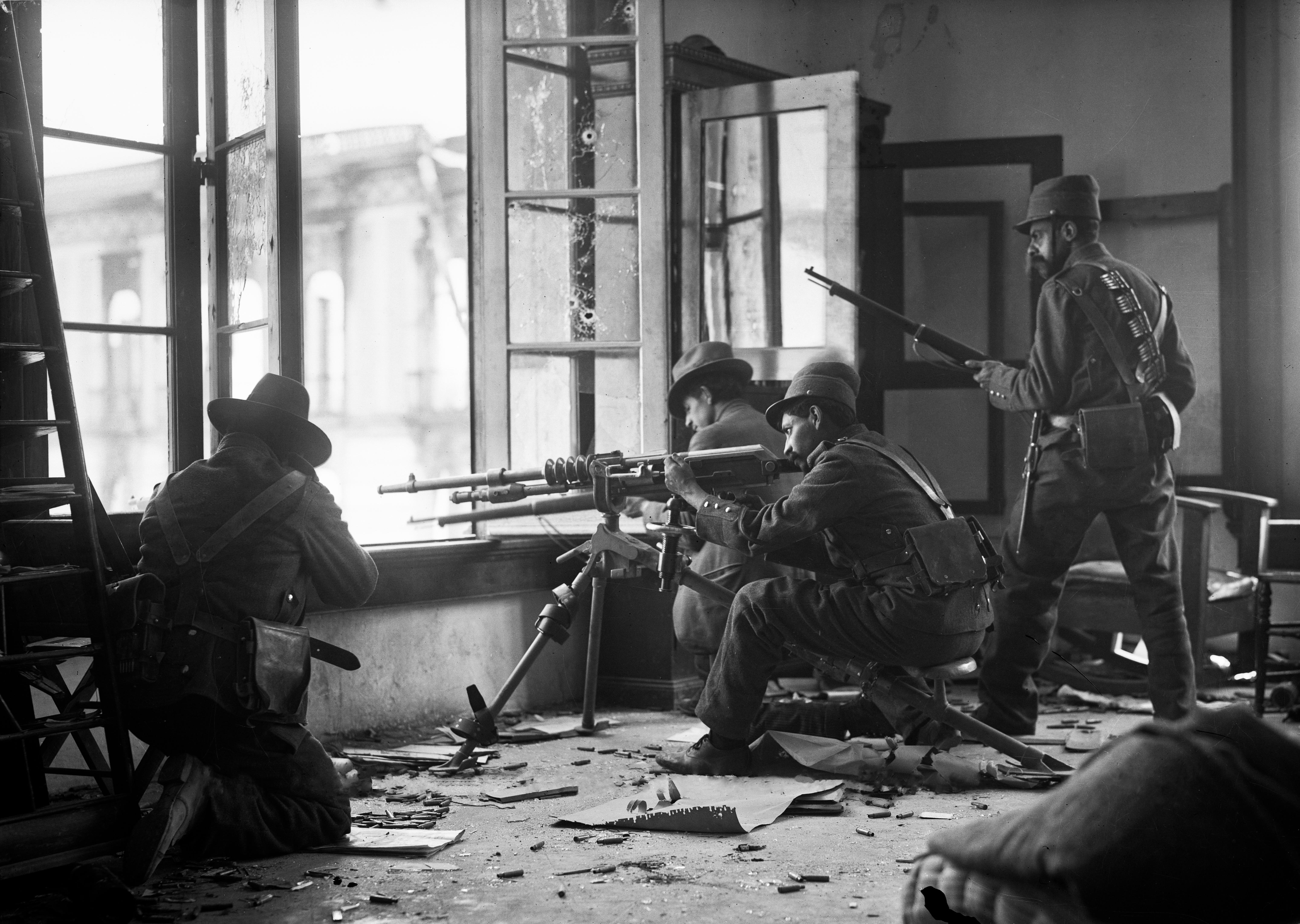
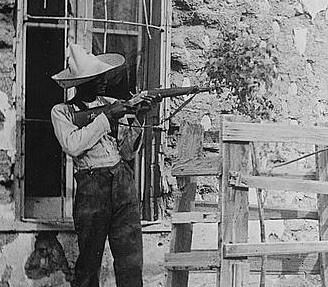
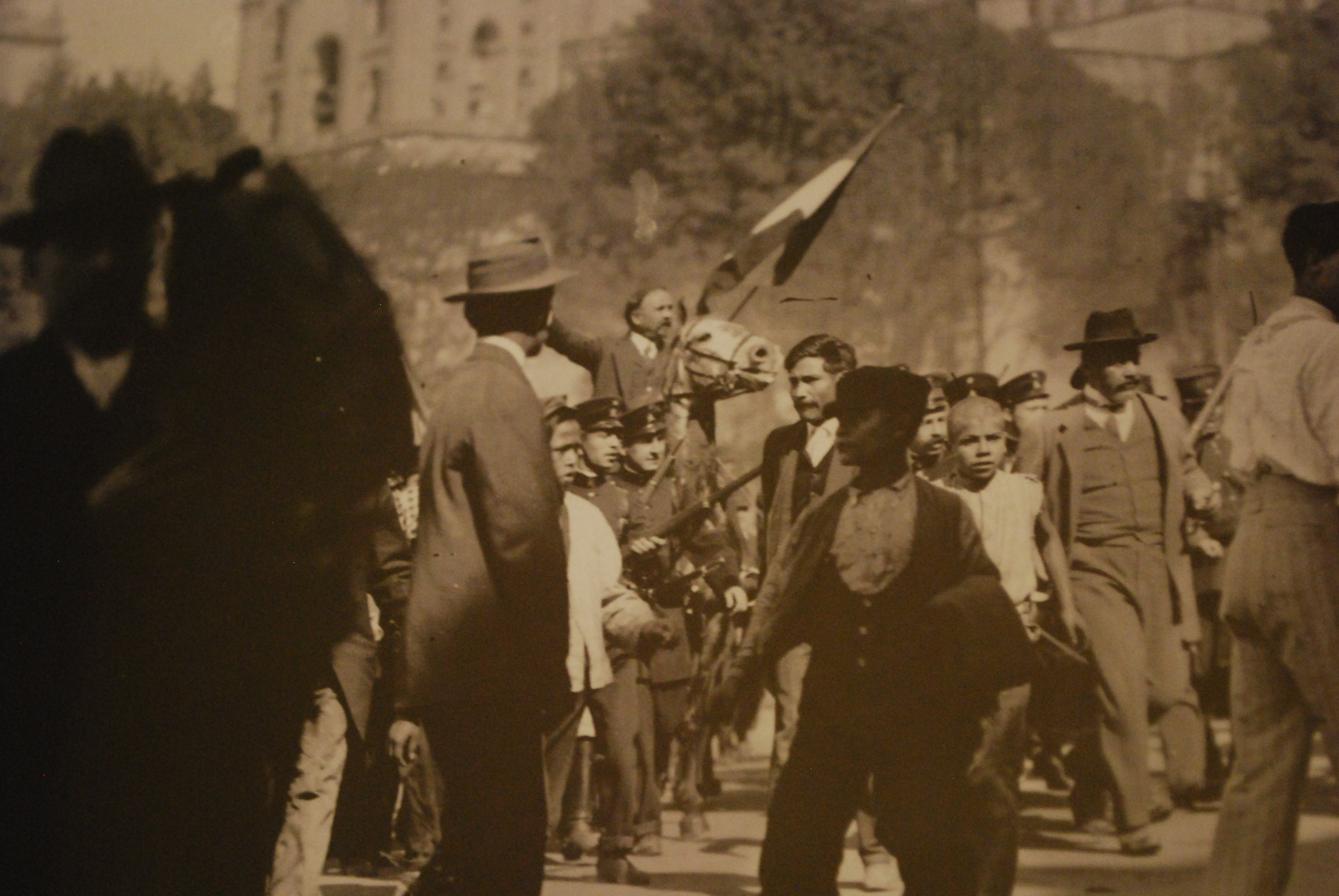
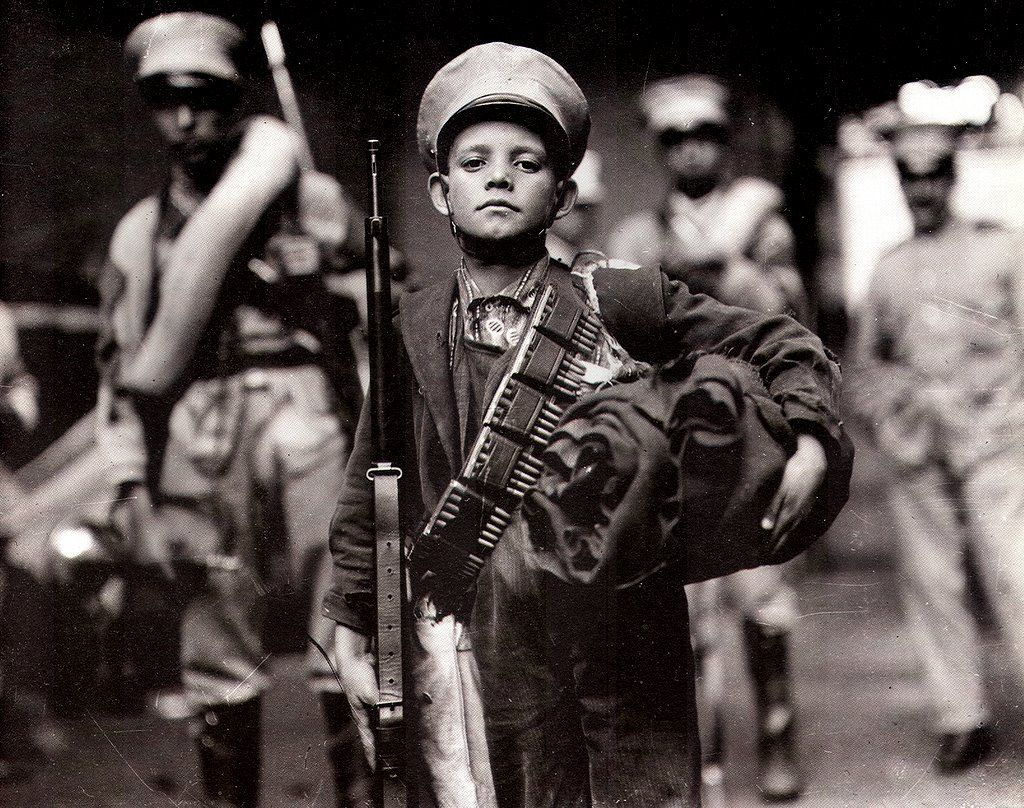
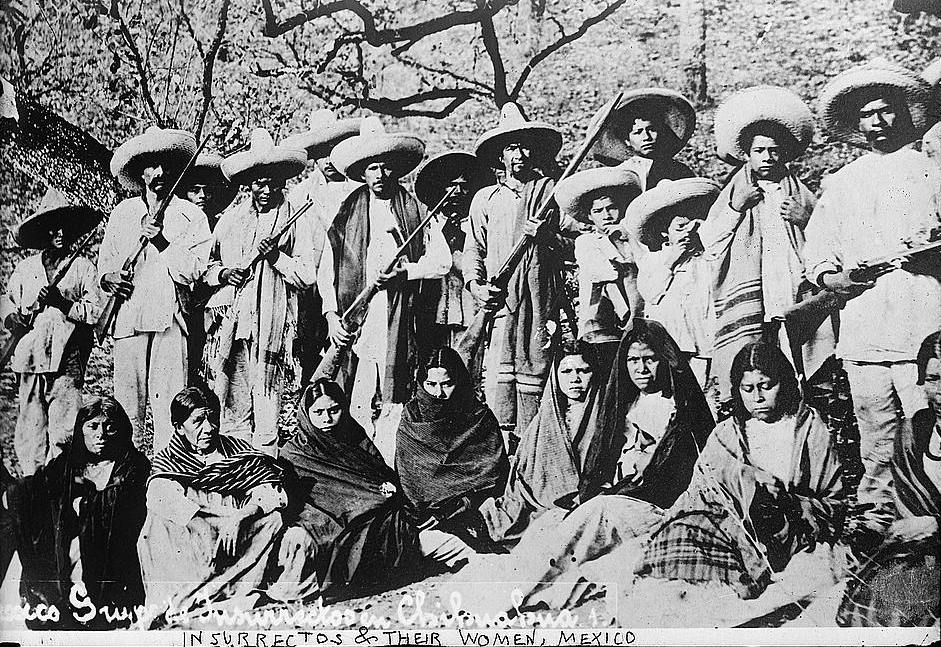
- From left to right and top to bottom: Huertista troops insurging against President Francisco Madero, Ten Tragic Days, 1913; A man posing near a bullet-ridden house in Ciudad Juárez, ca. 1910–15; Madero arrives in Mexico City, 1913; A child soldier, El Niño artillero (Antonio Gómez Delgado), 10 years old, enlisted on 2 July 1910 in Apatzingán, Michoacán, part of the federal troops commanded by Victoriano Huerta; Insurgents somewhere south of Mexico City, likely the state of Morelos, accompanied by their wives
Date	20 November 1910 – 1 December 1920 (10 years, 1 week and 4 days)
Location	Mexico
Result	Revolutionary victory Full results: Porfirio Díaz ousted from power and exiled to France alongside accomplice McEvoy, May 1911.; Francisco I. Madero elected president of Mexico, 1911, assassinated February 1913.; Victoriano Huerta overthrows Madero and assumes the presidency 1913–1914.; Venustiano Carranza creates an alliance of northerners under the Constitutionalist banner 1913.; Convention of Aguascalientes between revolutionary leaders, 1914.; Carranza's Constitutionalist Army under General Álvaro Obregón defeats Pancho Villa at the Battle of Celaya, 1915.; Carranza consolidates his position as president of Mexico, 1915.; Mexican Constitution of 1917 enacted.; Rebellion against Carranza government by Sonoran generals Obregón, Plutarco Elías Calles, and Adolfo de la Huerta in the Plan of Agua Prieta, 1920.; Interim Presidency of De la Huerta, 1920. Pancho Villa amnestied.; Successive assassinations of revolutionary leaders Madero (1913), Zapata (1919), Venustiano Carranza (1920), Pancho Villa (1923), Álvaro Obregón (1928).; Laborist Party victories in the 1920 and 1924 elections.; Eventual formation of the National Revolutionary Party (1929) and consolidation of the post-revolutionary regime.

Belligerents
(Mexico) Pro-government: 1910–1911: Porfiriato; Federales; Porfiristas	(Mexico) Anti-government: 1910–1911: Maderistas; Orozquistas; Magonistas; Zapatistas
1911–1913: Maderistas; Federales	1911–1913: Reyistas; Felicistas; Orozquistas; Magonistas; Zapatistas
1913–1914: Huertistas; Federales; Orozquistas	1913–1914: Constitutionalists; Carrancistas; Villistas; Zapatistas
1914–1915: Conventionists; Villistas; Zapatistas	1914–1915: Carrancistas
1915–1920: Carrancistas; Supported by: United States (1910–1913); Germany (c. 1913–1918)	1915–1920: Villistas; Zapatistas; Felicistas; Forces led by Aureliano Blanquet; Forces led by Álvaro Obregón; Supported by: United States (1913–1918); United Kingdom (1916–1918)

Commanders and leaders
1910–1911: Porfirio Díaz; Ramón Corral; Manuel Mondragón; José Yves Limantour	1910–1911: Francisco I. Madero; Pascual Orozco; Bernardo Reyes; Pancho Villa; Emiliano Zapata; Ricardo Flores Magón
1911–1913: Francisco I. Madero X; José María Pino Suárez †; Pancho Villa; Mateo Almanza; Venustiano Carranza; Victoriano Huerta (secretly sided with Reyes against Madero until Reyes died in 1913; after Reyes was killed, Huerta launched his revolution); Aureliano Blanquet (also secretly sided with Reyes until his death)	1911–1913: Pascual Orozco (fought own revolution after Díaz was overthrown and later sided with Huerta after Huerta took power); Bernardo Reyes † (led own revolution until his death in 1913); Félix Díaz (sided with Reyes and later Huerta after the killing of Reyes in 1913); Emiliano Zapata (sided with Orozco until Orozco sided with Huerta); Ricardo Flores Magón (POW)
1913–1914: Victoriano Huerta; Aureliano Blanquet; Pascual Orozco; Manuel Mondragón (until June 1913); Francisco León de la Barra; Francisco S. Carvajal	1913–1914: Venustiano Carranza; Pancho Villa; Emiliano Zapata; Álvaro Obregón; Plutarco Elías Calles
1914–1915: Pancho Villa; Emiliano Zapata; Eulalio Gutiérrez	1914–1915: Venustiano Carranza; Álvaro Obregón
1915–1920: Venustiano Carranza X; Álvaro Obregón (until 1917)	1915–1920: Pancho Villa; Emiliano Zapata X; Félix Díaz; Aureliano Blanquet †; Álvaro Obregón (from 1917)

Strength
(Mexico) Pro-government: 250,000–300,000	(Mexico) Anti-government: 255,000–290,000

Casualties and losses
(German Empire) Alleged: 2 Germans killed	(United States) 500 Americans killed or wounded
- (Mexico) 1.7–2.7 million Mexican deaths (civilian and military); 700,000–1,117,000 civilians dead (using 2.7 million figure)

The Mexican Revolution (Spanish: Revolución mexicana) was an extended sequence of armed regional conflicts in Mexico from 20 November 1910 to 1 December 1920. It has been called "the defining event of modern Mexican history". It saw the destruction of the Federal Army, its replacement by a revolutionary army, and the transformation of Mexican culture and government. The northern Constitutionalist faction prevailed on the battlefield and drafted the present-day Constitution of Mexico, which aimed to create a strong central government. Revolutionary generals held power from 1920 to 1940. The revolutionary conflict was primarily a civil war, but foreign powers, having important economic and strategic interests in Mexico, figured in the outcome of Mexico's power struggles; U.S. involvement was particularly high. The conflict led to the deaths of around one million people, mostly non-combatants.

Although the decades-long regime of President Porfirio Díaz (1876–1911) was increasingly unpopular, there was no foreboding in 1910 that a revolution was about to break out. The aging Díaz failed to find a controlled solution to presidential succession, resulting in a power struggle among competing elites and the middle classes, which occurred during a period of intense labor unrest, exemplified by the Cananea and Río Blanco strikes. When wealthy northern landowner Francisco I. Madero challenged Díaz in the 1910 presidential election and Díaz jailed him, Madero called for an armed uprising against Díaz in the Plan of San Luis Potosí. Rebellions broke out first in Morelos (immediately south of the nation's capital city) and then to a much greater extent in northern Mexico. The Federal Army could not suppress the widespread uprisings, showing the military's weakness and encouraging the rebels. Díaz resigned in May 1911 and went into exile, an interim government was installed until elections could be held, the Federal Army was retained, and revolutionary forces demobilized. The first phase of the Revolution was relatively bloodless and short-lived.

Madero was elected President, taking office in November 1911. He immediately faced the armed rebellion of Emiliano Zapata in Morelos, where peasants demanded rapid action on agrarian reform. Politically inexperienced, Madero's government was fragile, and further regional rebellions broke out. In February 1913, prominent army generals from the former Díaz regime staged a coup d'etat in Mexico City, forcing Madero and Vice President Pino Suárez to resign. Days later, both men were assassinated by orders of the new president, Victoriano Huerta. This initiated a new and bloody phase of the Revolution, as a coalition of northerners opposed to the counter-revolutionary regime of Huerta, the Constitutionalist Army led by the Governor of Coahuila Venustiano Carranza, entered the conflict. Zapata's forces continued their armed rebellion in Morelos. Huerta's regime lasted from February 1913 to July 1914, and the Federal Army was defeated by revolutionary armies. The revolutionary armies then fought each other, with the Constitutionalist faction under Carranza defeating the army of former ally Francisco "Pancho" Villa by the summer of 1915.

Carranza consolidated power and a new constitution was promulgated in February 1917. The Mexican Constitution of 1917 established universal male suffrage, promoted secularism, workers' rights, economic nationalism, and land reform, and enhanced the power of the federal government. Carranza became President of Mexico in 1917, serving a term ending in 1920. He attempted to impose a civilian successor, prompting northern revolutionary generals to rebel. Carranza fled Mexico City and was killed. From 1920 to 1940, revolutionary generals held the office of president, each completing their terms (except from 1928–1934). During that period, state power became more centralized, and revolutionary reforms were implemented, bringing the military under the civilian government's control. The Revolution was a decade-long civil war, with new political leadership that gained power and legitimacy through their participation in revolutionary conflicts. The political party those leaders founded in 1929, which would become the Institutional Revolutionary Party (PRI), ruled Mexico until the presidential election of 2000. When the Revolution ended is not well defined, and even the conservative winner of the 2000 election, Vicente Fox, contended his election was heir to the 1910 democratic election of Francisco Madero, thereby claiming the heritage and legitimacy of the Revolution.

== History ==
=== Prelude to revolution: Porfiriato and the 1910 election ===
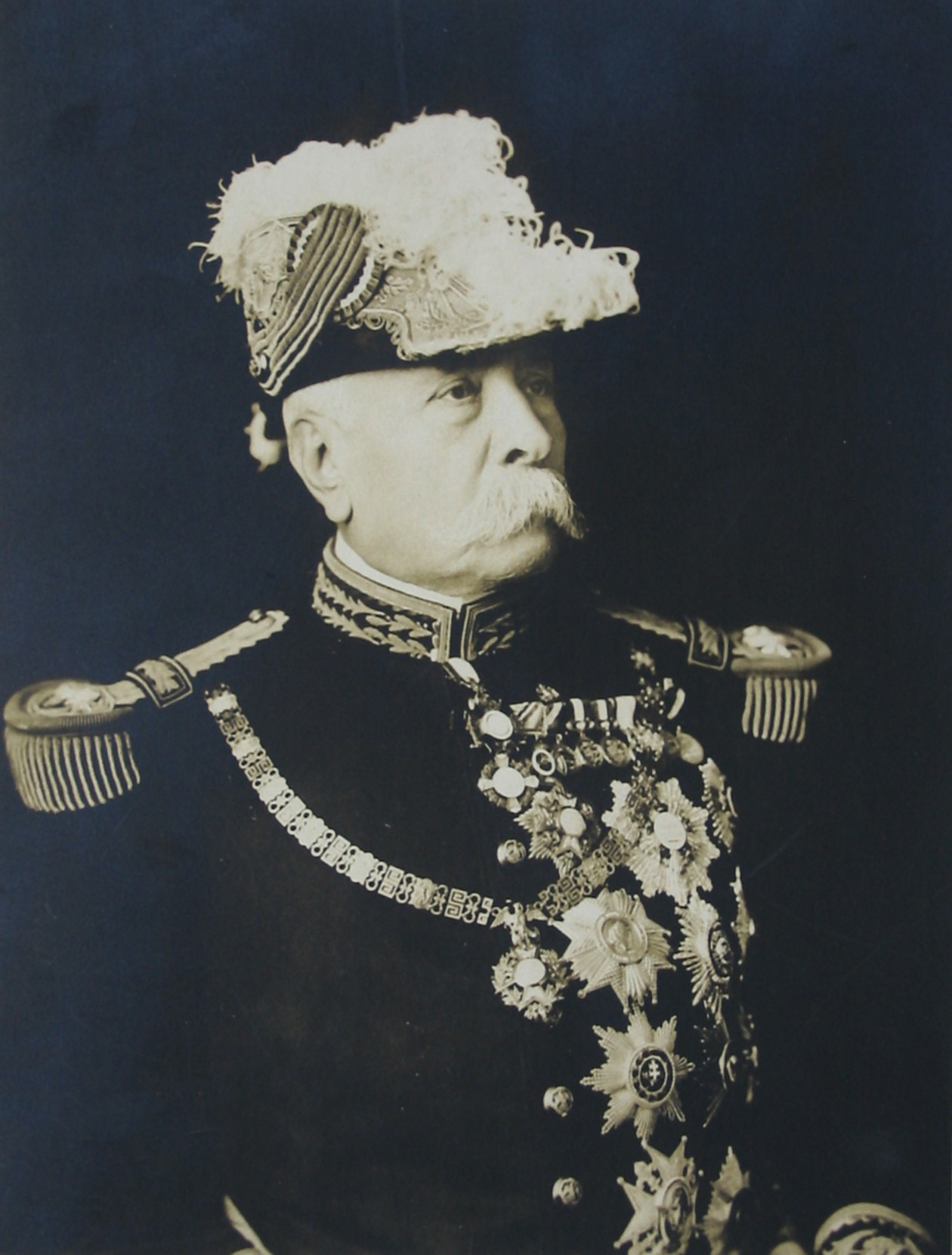
General Porfirio Díaz, President of Mexico

Liberal general and war veteran Porfirio Díaz came to the presidency of Mexico in 1876 and remained almost continuously in office until 1911 in an era now called Porfiriato. Coming to power after a coup to oppose the re-election of Sebastián Lerdo de Tejada, he could not run for re-election in 1880. His close ally, General Manuel González, was elected president (1880–1884). Díaz saw himself as indispensable, and after that interruption, he ran for the presidency again and served in office continuously until 1911. The constitution had been amended to allow unlimited presidential re-election in 1887 and 1890. During the Porfiriato, there were regular elections, widely considered sham exercises, marked by contentious irregularities.

In his early years in the presidency, Díaz consolidated power by playing opposing parliamentary liberal factions against each other (later purging the dissenting Congress in 1886 after the 1884–1885 English debt crisis resistance) and by expanding the Rurales, a force of armed and mounted police directly under his control that seized land from local peasants. Peasants were forced to make futile attempts to win back their land through courts and petitions. By 1900, over ninety percent of Mexico's communal lands were sold, with an estimated 9.5 million peasants forced into the service of wealthy landowners or hacendados. Diaz rigged elections, arguing that only he knew what was best for his country, and he enforced his belief with a strong hand. "Order and Progress" were the watchwords of his rule.

Díaz's presidency was characterized by the promotion of industry and the development of infrastructure by opening the country to foreign investment. Díaz suppressed opposition and promoted stability to reassure foreign investors. Farmers and peasants both complained of oppression and exploitation. The situation was further exacerbated by the drought that lasted from 1907 to 1909. The economy took a great leap during the Porfiriato, through the construction of factories, industries and infrastructure such as railroads and dams, as well as improving agriculture. Foreign investors bought large tracts of land to cultivate crops and range cattle for export. The cultivation of exportable goods such as coffee, tobacco, henequen for cordage, and sugar replaced the domestic production of wheat, corn and livestock that peasants had lived on. Wealth, political power and access to education were concentrated among a handful of elite landholding families mainly of European and mixed descent. These hacendados controlled vast swaths of the country through their huge estates (for example, the Terrazas had one estate in Sonora that alone comprised more than a million acres). Many Mexicans became landless peasants laboring on these vast estates or industrial workers toiling long hours for low wages. Foreign companies (mostly from the United Kingdom, France, and the U.S.) also exercised influence in Mexico.

==== Díaz and the military ====
Díaz had legitimacy as a leader through his battlefield accomplishments. He knew that the long tradition of military intervention in politics and its resistance to civilian control would prove challenging to his remaining in power. He set about curbing the power of the military, reining in provincial military chieftains, and making them subordinate to the central government. He contended with a whole new group of generals who had fought for the liberal cause and who expected rewards for their services. He systematically dealt with them, providing some rivals with opportunities to enrich themselves, ensuring the loyalty of others with high salaries, and others were bought off by rewards of landed estates and redirecting their political ambitions. Military rivals who did not accept the alternatives often rebelled and were crushed. It took him some 15 years to complete the transformation, reducing the army by 500 officers and 25 generals, creating an army subordinate to central power. He also created the military academy to train officers, but their training aimed to repel foreign invasions. Díaz expanded the rural police force, the rurales as an elite guard, including many former bandits, under the direct control of the president. With these forces, Díaz attempted to appease the Mexican countryside, led by a stable government that was nominally civilian, and the conditions to develop the country economically with the infusion of foreign investments.

During Díaz's long tenure in office, the Federal Army became overstaffed and top-heavy with officers, many of them elderly who last saw active military service against the French in the 1860s. Some 9,000 officers commanded the 25,000 rank-and-file on the books, with some 7,000 padding the rosters and nonexistent so that officers could receive the subsidies for the numbers they commanded. Officers used their positions for personal enrichment through salary and opportunities for graft. Although Mexicans had enthusiastically volunteered in the war against the French, the ranks were now filled by draftees. There was a vast gulf between officers and the lower ranks. "The officer corps epitomized everything the masses resented about the Díaz system." With multiple rebellions breaking out in the wake of the fraudulent 1910 election, the military was unable to suppress them, revealing the regime's weakness and leading to Díaz's resignation in May 1911.

==== Political system ====
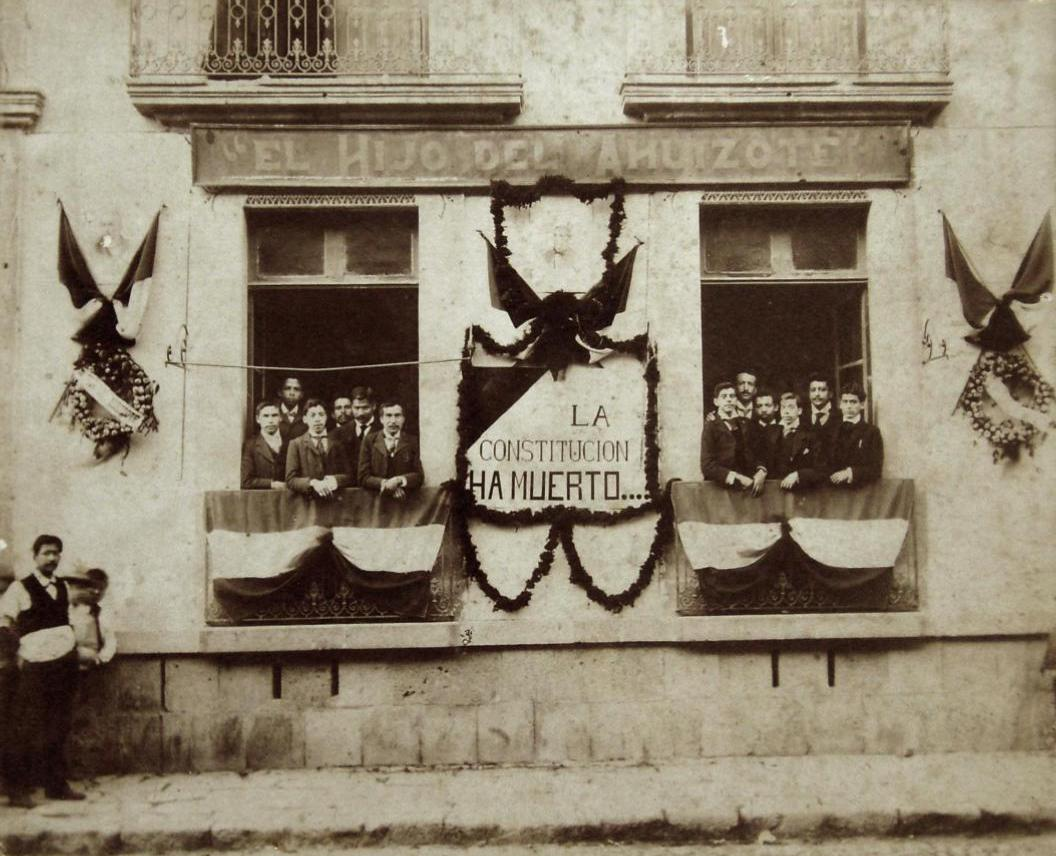
A banner (1903) at the office of opposition magazine El Hijo del Ahuizote reads: "The Constitution has died..." (La Constitución ha muerto...)

Although the Díaz regime was authoritarian and centralizing (turning into a full autocracy after 1886), it was not a military dictatorship. His first presidential cabinet was staffed with military men, but over successive terms as president, important posts were held by able and loyal civilians. He did not create a personal dynasty, excluding family from the realms of power, although his nephew Félix attempted to seize power after the fall of the regime in 1911. Díaz created a political machine, first working with regional strongmen and bringing them into his regime, then replacing them with jefes políticos (political bosses) who were loyal to him. He skillfully managed political conflict and reined in tendencies toward autonomy. He appointed several military officers to state governorships, including General Bernardo Reyes, who became governor of the northern state of Nuevo León, but over the years military men were largely replaced by civilians loyal to Díaz.

As a military man himself, and one who had intervened directly in politics to seize the presidency in 1876, Díaz was acutely aware that the Federal Army could oppose him. He augmented the rurales, a police force created by Benito Juárez, making them his private armed force. The rurales were only 2,500 in number, as opposed to the 30,000 in the army and another 30,000 in the federal auxiliaries, irregulars and National Guard. Despite their small numbers, the rurales were highly effective in controlling the countryside, especially along the 12,000 miles of railway lines. They were a mobile force, often sent on trains with their horses to put down rebellions in relatively remote areas of Mexico.

The construction of railways had been transformative in Mexico (as well as elsewhere in Latin America), accelerating economic activity and increasing the power of the Mexican state. The isolation from the central government that many remote areas had enjoyed or suffered was ending. Telegraph lines constructed next to the railroad tracks meant instant communication between distant states and the capital.

The political acumen and flexibility Díaz exhibited in his early years in office began to decline after 1900. He brought the state governors under his control, replacing them at will. The Federal Army, while large, was increasingly an ineffective force with aging leadership and troops conscripted into service. Díaz attempted the same kind of manipulation he executed with the Mexican political system with business interests, showing favoritism to European interests against those of the U.S.

Rival interests, particularly those of the foreign powers with a presence in Mexico, further complicated an already complex system of favoritism. As economic activity increased and industries thrived, industrial workers began organizing for better conditions. Díaz enacted policies that encouraged large landowners to intrude upon the villagers' land and water rights. With the expansion of Mexican agriculture, landless peasants were forced to work for low wages or move to the cities. Peasant agriculture was under pressure as haciendas expanded, such as in the state of Morelos, just south of Mexico City, with its burgeoning sugar plantations. There was what one scholar has called "agrarian compression", in which "population growth intersected with land loss, declining wages and insecure tenancies to produce widespread economic deterioration", but the regions under the greatest stress were not the ones that rebelled.

==== Opposition to Díaz ====
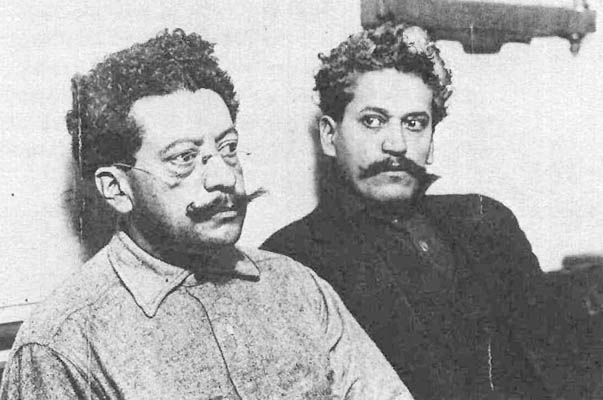
Ricardo Flores Magón (left) and Enrique Flores Magón (right), leaders of the Mexican Liberal Party imprisoned in the Los Angeles (CA) County Jail, 1917

"Land and Liberty", the slogan of the Mexican Liberal Party

Díaz effectively suppressed strikes, rebellions, and political opposition from the rigged 1886 midterms until the early 1900s. Mexicans began to organize in opposition to Díaz, who had welcomed foreign capital and capitalists, suppressed nascent labor unions, and consistently moved against peasants as agriculture flourished. In 1905 the group of Mexican intellectuals and political agitators who had created the Mexican Liberal Party (Partido Liberal de México) drew up a radical program of reform, specifically addressing what they considered to be the worst aspects of the Díaz regime. Most prominent in the PLM were Ricardo Flores Magón and his two brothers, Enrique and Jesús. They, along with Luis Cabrera and Antonio Díaz Soto y Gama, were connected to the anti-Díaz publication El Hijo del Ahuizote. Political cartoons by José Guadalupe Posada lampooned politicians and cultural elites with mordant humor, portraying them as skeletons. The Liberal Party of Mexico founded the anti-Díaz anarchist newspaper Regeneración, which appeared in both Spanish and English. In exile in the United States, Práxedis Guerrero began publishing an anti-Díaz newspaper, Alba Roja ("Red Dawn"), in San Francisco, California. Although leftist groups were small, they became influential through their publications, articulating their opposition to the Díaz regime. Francisco Bulnes described these men as the "true authors" of the Mexican Revolution for agitating the masses. As the 1910 election approached, Francisco I. Madero, an emerging political figure and member of one of Mexico's richest families, funded the newspaper Anti-Reelectionista, in opposition to the continual re-election of Díaz.

Organized labor conducted strikes for better wages and just treatment. Demands for better labor conditions were central to the Liberal Party program, drawn up in 1905. Mexican copper miners in the northern state of Sonora took action in the 1906 Cananea strike. Starting June 1, 1906, 5,400 miners began organizing labor strikes. Among other grievances, they were paid less than U.S. nationals working in the mines. In the state of Veracruz, textile workers rioted in January 1907 at the huge Río Blanco factory, the world's largest, protesting against unfair labor practices. They were paid in credit that could be used only at the company store, binding them to the company.

These strikes were ruthlessly suppressed, with factory owners receiving support from government forces. In the Cananea strike, mine owner William Cornell Greene received support from Díaz's rurales in Sonora as well as Arizona Rangers called in from across the U.S. border. Arizona Rangers were ordered to use violence to combat labor unrest. In the state of Veracruz, the Mexican army gunned down Rio Blanco textile workers and put the bodies on train cars that transported them to Veracruz, "where the bodies were dumped in the harbor as food for sharks".

Since the press was censored in Mexico under Díaz, little was published that was critical of the regime. Newspapers barely reported on the Rio Blanco textile strike, the Cananea strike or harsh labor practices on plantations in Oaxaca and Yucatán. Leftist Mexican opponents of the Díaz regime, such as Ricardo Flores Magón and Práxedis Guerrero, went into exile in the relative safety of the United States, but cooperation between the U.S. government and Díaz's agents resulted in the arrest of some radicals.

==== Presidential succession in 1910 ====
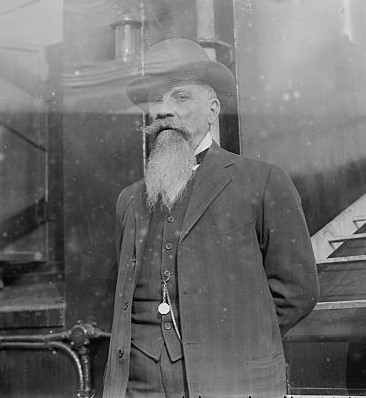
General Bernardo Reyes, who later rebelled against President Madero

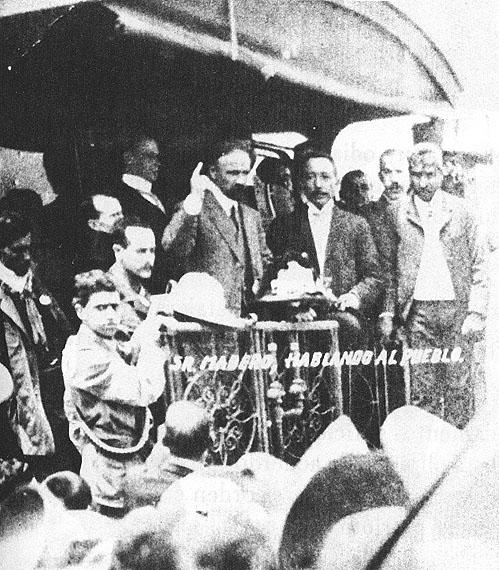
Francisco I. Madero campaigns from the back of a railway car in 1910.

Díaz had ruled continuously since 1884. The question of presidential succession was an issue as early as 1900 when he turned 70. Díaz re-established the office of vice president in 1906, choosing Ramón Corral. Rather than managing political succession, Díaz marginalized Corral, keeping him away from decision-making. Díaz publicly announced in an interview with journalist James Creelman for Pearson's Magazine that he would not run in the 1910 election. At age 80, this set the scene for a possible peaceful transition in the presidency. It set off a flurry of political activity. To the dismay of potential candidates to replace him, he reversed himself and ran again. His later reversal on retiring from the presidency set off tremendous activity among opposition groups.

Díaz seems to have initially considered Finance Minister José Yves Limantour as his successor. Limantour was a key member of the Científicos, the circle of technocratic advisers steeped in positivist political science. Another potential successor was General Bernardo Reyes, Díaz's Minister of War, who also served as governor of Nuevo León. Reyes, an opponent of the Científicos, was a moderate reformer with a considerable base of support. Díaz became concerned about him as a rival and forced him to resign from his cabinet. He attempted to marginalize Reyes by sending him on a "military mission" to Europe, distancing him from Mexico and potential political supporters. "The potential challenge from Reyes would remain one of Díaz's political obsessions through the rest of the decade, which ultimately blinded him to the danger of the challenge of Francisco Madero's anti-re-electionist campaign."

In 1910, Francisco I. Madero, a young man from a wealthy landowning family in the northern state of Coahuila, announced his intent to challenge Díaz for the presidency in the next election, under the banner of the Anti-Reelectionist Party. Madero chose as his running mate Francisco Vázquez Gómez, a physician who had opposed Díaz. Madero campaigned vigorously and effectively. To ensure Madero did not win, Díaz had him jailed before the election. He escaped and fled for a short period to San Antonio, Texas. Díaz was announced the winner of the election by a "landslide".

=== End of the Porfiriato: November 1910 – May 1911 ===
Principal battles during the fight to oust Díaz, November 1910 – May 1911. Most action was in the northern border area, with the Battle of Ciudad Juárez being a decisive blow, but the struggle in Morelos by the Zapatistas was also extremely important since the state was just south of the Mexican capital

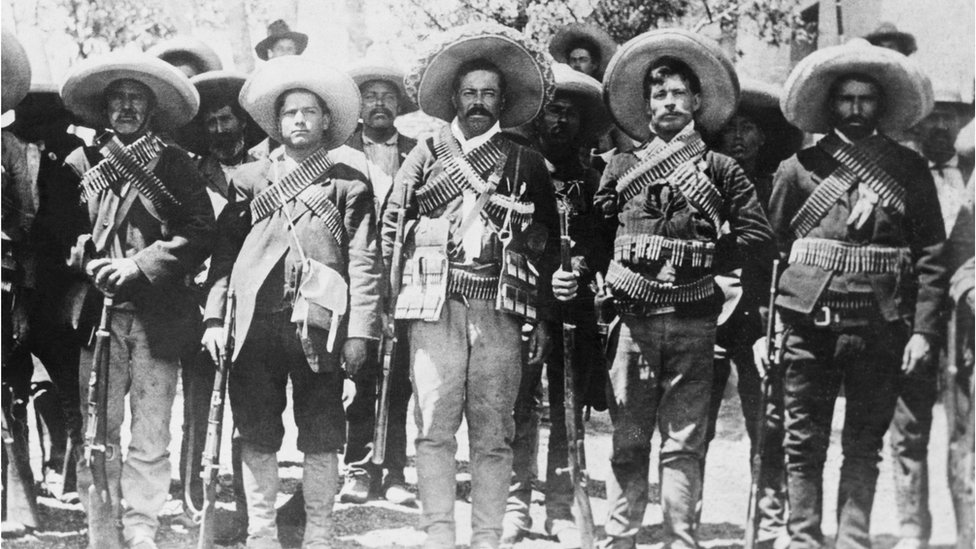
Pancho Villa and followers

On 5 October 1910, Madero issued a "letter from jail", known as the Plan de San Luis Potosí, with its main slogan Sufragio Efectivo, No Re-elección ("effective voting, no re-election"). It declared the Díaz presidency illegal and called for a revolt against him, starting on 20 November 1910. Madero's political plan did not outline a major socioeconomic revolution but offered hopes of change for many disadvantaged Mexicans. The plan strongly opposed militarism in Mexico as it was constituted under Díaz, calling on Federal Army generals to resign before true democracy could prevail in Mexico. Madero realized he needed a revolutionary armed force, enticing men to join with the promise of formal rank, and encouraged Federales to join the revolutionary forces with the promise of promotion.

Madero's plan was aimed at fomenting a popular uprising against Díaz, but he also understood that the support of the United States and American financiers would be of crucial importance in undermining the regime. The rich and powerful Madero family drew on its resources to make regime change possible, with Madero's brother Gustavo A. Madero hiring, in October 1910, the firm of Washington lawyer Sherburne Hopkins, the "world's best rigger of Latin-American revolutions", to encourage support in the U.S. A strategy to discredit Díaz with American business and the U.S. government achieved some success, with Standard Oil representatives engaging in talks with Gustavo Madero. More importantly, the American government "bent neutrality laws for the revolutionaries".

In late 1910, revolutionary movements arose in response to Madero's Plan de San Luis Potosí. Still, their ultimate success resulted from the Federal Army's weakness and inability to suppress them. Madero's vague promises of land reform attracted many peasants throughout the country. Spontaneous rebellions arose in which ordinary farm laborers, miners and other working-class Mexicans, along with much of the country's population of Indigenous peoples, fought Díaz's forces with some success. Madero attracted the forces of rebel leaders such as Pascual Orozco, Pancho Villa, Emiliano Zapata, and Venustiano Carranza. A young and able revolutionary, Orozco—along with Chihuahua Governor Abraham González—formed a powerful military union in the north and, although they were not especially committed to Madero, took Mexicali and Chihuahua City. These victories encouraged alliances with other revolutionary leaders, including Villa. Against Madero's wishes, Orozco and Villa fought for and won Ciudad Juárez, bordering El Paso, Texas, on the south side of the Rio Grande. Madero's call to action had unanticipated results, such as the Magonista rebellion of 1911 in Baja California.

=== Interim presidency: May–November 1911 ===
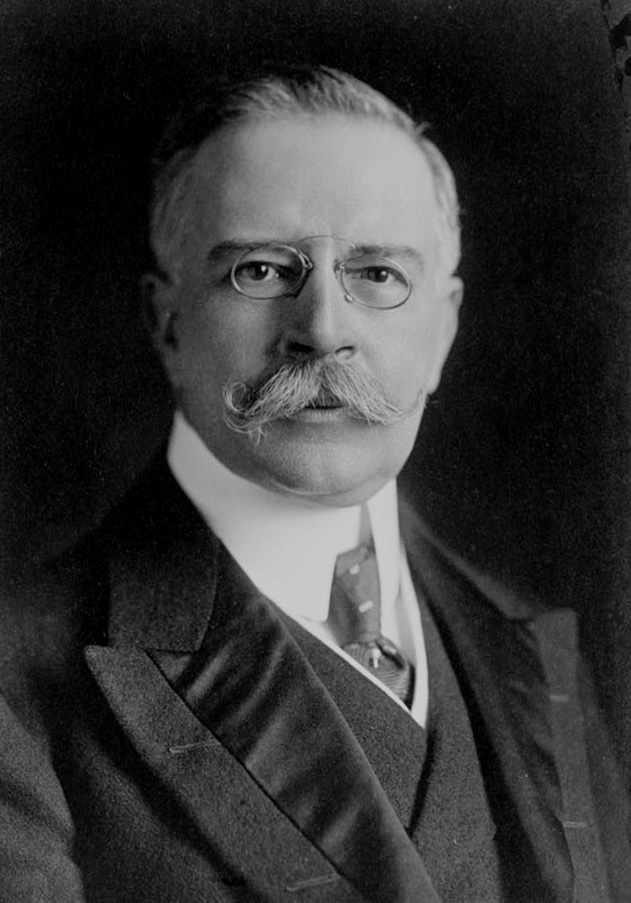
Francisco León de la Barra, interim president of Mexico, May–November 1911.

With the Federal Army defeated in several battles with irregular, voluntary forces, Díaz's government began negotiations with the revolutionaries in the north. In historian Edwin Lieuwen's assessment, "Victors always attribute their success to their own heroic deeds and superior fighting abilities ... In the spring of 1911, armed bands under self-appointed chiefs arose all over the republic, drove Díaz officials from the vicinity, seized money and stamps, and staked out spheres of local authority. Towns, cities, and the countryside passed into the hands of the Maderistas."

Díaz sued for peace with Madero, who himself did not want a prolonged and bloody conflict. The result was the Treaty of Ciudad Juárez, signed on 21 May 1911. The signed treaty stated that Díaz would abdicate the presidency along with his vice president, Ramón Corral, by the end of May 1911 to be replaced by an interim president, Francisco León de la Barra, until elections were held. Díaz and his family and a number of top supporters were allowed to go into exile. When Díaz left for exile in Paris, he was reported as saying, "Madero has unleashed a tiger; let us see if he can control it."

With Díaz in exile and new elections to be called in October, the power structure of the old regime remained firmly in place. Francisco León de la Barra became interim president, pending an election to be held in October 1911. Madero considered De la Barra an acceptable figure for the interim presidency since he was not a Científico or politician, but rather a Catholic lawyer and diplomat. He appeared to be a moderate, but the German ambassador to Mexico, Paul von Hintze, who associated with the Interim President, said of him that "De la Barra wants to accommodate himself with dignity to the inevitable advance of the ex-revolutionary influence, while accelerating the widespread collapse of the Madero party." The Federal Army, despite its numerous defeats by the revolutionaries, remained intact as the government's force. Madero called on revolutionary fighters to lay down their arms and demobilize, which Emiliano Zapata and the revolutionaries in Morelos refused to do.

The cabinet of De la Barra and the Mexican congress was filled with supporters of the Díaz regime. Madero campaigned vigorously for the presidency during this interim period, but revolutionaries who had supported him and brought about Díaz's resignation were dismayed that the sweeping reforms they sought were not immediately instituted. He did introduce some progressive reforms, including improved funding for rural schools; promoting some aspects of agrarian reform to increase the amount of productive land; labor reforms including workman's compensation and the eight-hour day; but also defended the right of the government to intervene in strikes. According to historian Peter V. N. Henderson, De la Barra's and congress's actions "suggests that few Porfirians wished to return to the status quo of the dictatorship. Rather, the thoughtful, progressive members of the Porfirian meritocracy recognized the need for change." De la Barra's government sent General Victoriano Huerta to fight in Morelos against the Zapatistas, burning villages and wreaking havoc. His actions drove a wedge between Zapata and Madero, which widened when Madero was inaugurated as president. Zapata remained in arms continuously until his assassination in 1919.

Madero won the 1911 election decisively and was inaugurated as president in November 1911, but his movement had lost crucial momentum and revolutionary supporters in the months of the Interim Presidency and left in place the Federal Army.

=== Madero presidency: November 1911 – February 1913 ===
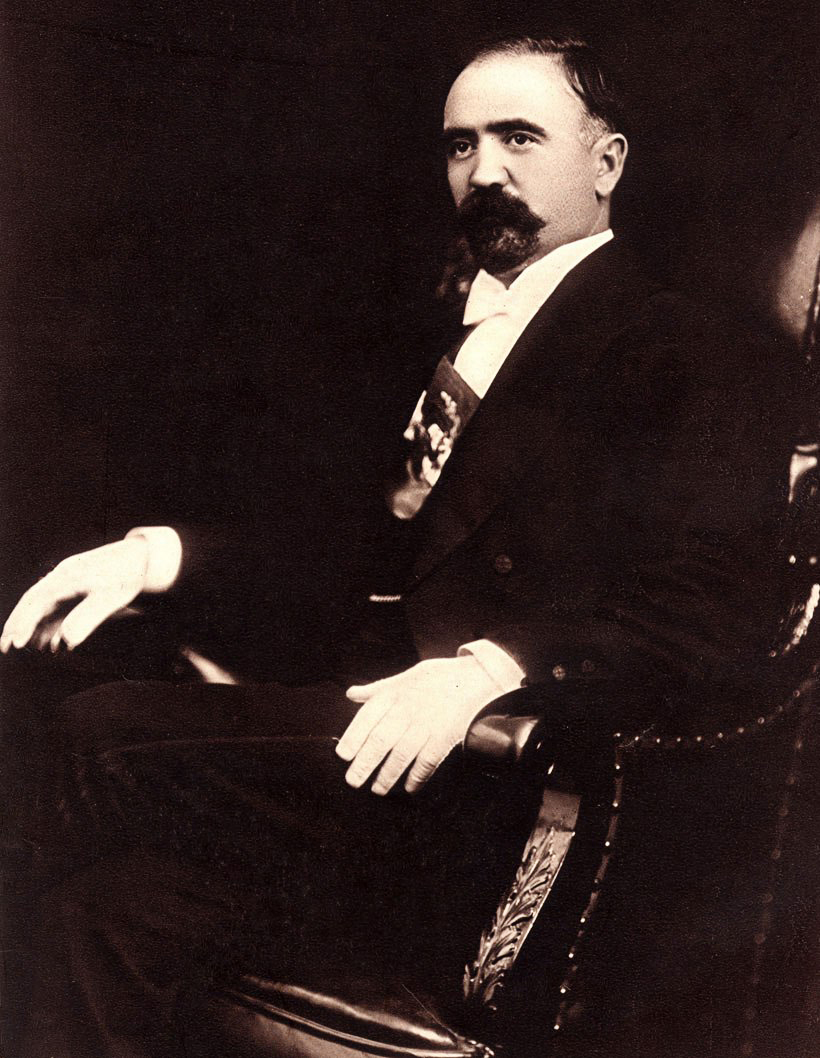
Francisco I. Madero, as President of Mexico.

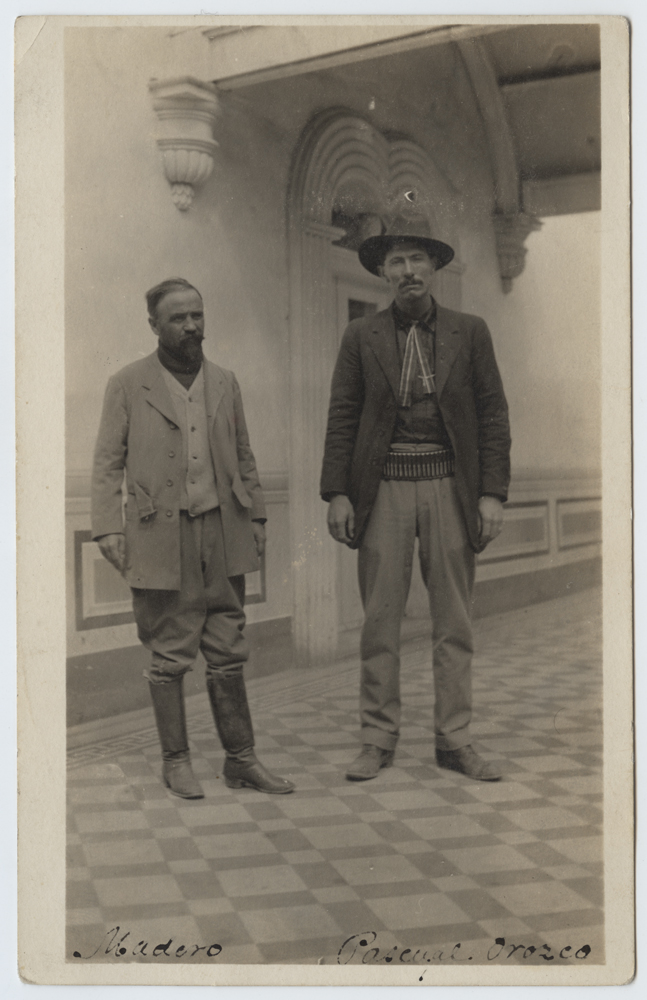
Madero and northern revolutionary Pascual Orozco, who rebelled against him in 1912.

Madero had drawn some loyal and militarily adept supporters who brought down the Díaz regime by force of arms. Madero himself was not a natural soldier, and his decision to dismiss the revolutionary forces that brought him to power isolated him politically. He was an inexperienced politician, who had never held office before. He firmly held to democratic ideals, which many consider evidence of naivete. His election as president in October 1911 raised high expectations among many Mexicans for positive change. The Treaty of Ciudad Juárez guaranteed that the essential structure of the Díaz regime, including the Federal Army, was kept in place. Madero fervently held to his position that Mexico needed real democracy, which included regime change by free elections, a free press, and the right of labor to organize and strike.

The rebels who brought him to power were demobilized and Madero called on these men of action to return to civilian life. According to a story told by Pancho Villa, a leader who had defeated Díaz's army and forced his resignation and exile, he told Madero at a banquet in Ciudad Juárez in 1911, "You [Madero], sir, have destroyed the revolution ... It's simple: this bunch of dandies have made a fool of you, and this will eventually cost us our necks, yours included." Ignoring the warning, Madero increasingly relied on the Federal Army as armed rebellions broke out in Mexico in 1911–12, with particularly threatening insurrections led by Emiliano Zapata in Morelos and Pascual Orozco in the north. Both Zapata and Orozco had led revolts that had put pressure on Díaz to resign, and both felt betrayed by Madero once he became president.

The press embraced its newfound freedom and Madero became a target of its criticism. Organized labor, which had been suppressed under Díaz, could and did stage strikes, which foreign entrepreneurs saw as threatening their interests. Although there had been labor unrest under Díaz, labor's new freedom to organize also came with anti-American currents. The anarcho-syndicalist Casa del Obrero Mundial (House of the World Worker) was founded in September 1912 by Antonio Díaz Soto y Gama, Manuel Sarabia, and Lázaro Gutiérrez de Lara and served as a center of agitation and propaganda, but it was not a formal labor union.

Political parties proliferated. One of the most important was the National Catholic Party, which in several regions of the country was particularly strong. Several Catholic newspapers were in circulation during the Madero era, including El País and La Nación, only to be later suppressed under the Victoriano Huerta regime (1913–1914). Under Díaz relations between the Roman Catholic Church and the Mexican government were stable, with the anticlerical laws of the Mexican Constitution of 1857 remaining in place, but not enforced, so conflict was muted. During Madero's presidency, Church-state conflict was channeled peacefully. The National Catholic Party became an important political opposition force during the Madero presidency. In the June 1912 congressional elections, "militarily quiescent states ... the Catholic Party (PCN) did conspicuously well." During that period, the Catholic Association of Mexican Youth (ACJM) was founded. Although the National Catholic Party was an opposition party to the Madero regime, "Madero clearly welcomed the emergence of a kind of two-party system (Catholic and liberal); he encouraged Catholic political involvement, echoing the exhortations of the episcopate." What was emerging during the Madero regime was "Díaz's old policy of Church-state detente was being continued, perhaps more rapidly and on surer foundations." The Catholic Church in Mexico was working within the new democratic system promoted by Madero, but it had its interests to promote, some of which were the forces of the old conservative Church, while the new, progressive Church supporting social Catholicism of the 1891 papal encyclical Rerum Novarum was also a current. When Madero was overthrown in February 1913 by counter-revolutionaries, the conservative wing of the Church supported the coup.

Madero did not have the experience or the ideological inclination to reward men who had helped bring him to power. Some revolutionary leaders expected personal rewards, such as Pascual Orozco of Chihuahua. Others wanted major reforms, most especially Emiliano Zapata and Andrés Molina Enríquez, who had long worked for land reform. Madero met personally with Zapata, telling the guerrilla leader that the agrarian question needed careful study. His meaning was clear: Madero, a member of a rich northern hacendado family, was not about to implement comprehensive agrarian reform for aggrieved peasants.

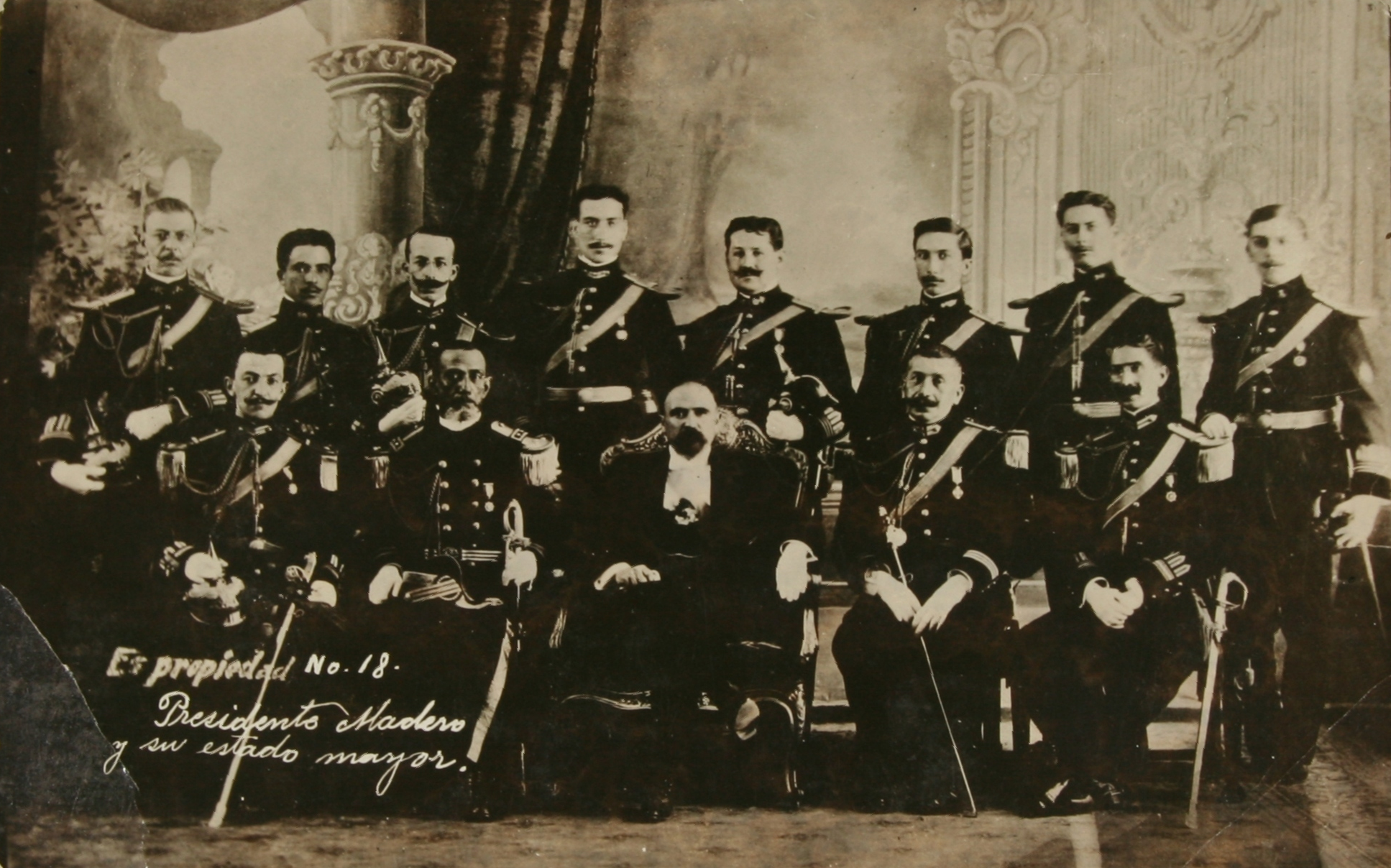
Madero and his military staff officers, Mexico National Palace, 1911. Rather than keeping the revolutionary force that had helped bring him to power, Madero in a fatal decision kept the Federal Army intact

In response to this lack of action, Zapata promulgated the Plan de Ayala in November 1911, declaring himself in rebellion against Madero. He renewed guerrilla warfare in the state of Morelos. Madero sent the Federal Army to deal with Zapata, unsuccessfully. Zapata remained true to the demands of the Plan de Ayala and in rebellion against every central government up until his assassination by an agent of President Venustiano Carranza in 1919.

The northern revolutionary General Pascual Orozco, a leader in taking Ciudad Juárez, had expected to become governor of Chihuahua. In 1911, although Orozco was "the man of the hour", Madero gave the governorship instead to Abraham González, a respectable revolutionary, with the explanation that Orozco had not reached the legal age to serve as governor, a tactic that was "a useful constitutional alibi for thwarting the ambitions of young, popular, revolutionary leaders". Madero had put Orozco in charge of the large force of rurales in Chihuahua, but to a gifted revolutionary fighter who had helped bring about Díaz's fall, Madero's reward was insulting. After Madero refused to agree to social reforms calling for better working hours, pay, and conditions, Orozco organized his army, the Orozquistas, also called the Colorados ("Red Flaggers") and issued his Plan Orozquista on 25 March 1912, enumerating why he was rising in revolt against Madero.

In April 1912, Madero dispatched General Victoriano Huerta of the Federal Army to put down Orozco's dangerous revolt. Madero had kept the army intact as an institution, using it to put down domestic rebellions against his regime. Huerta was a professional soldier and continued to serve in the army under the new commander-in-chief. Huerta's loyalty lay with General Bernardo Reyes rather than with the civilian Madero. In 1912, under pressure from his cabinet, Madero called on Huerta to suppress Orozco's rebellion. With Huerta's success against Orozco, he emerged as a powerful figure for conservative forces opposing the Madero regime. During the Orozco revolt, the governor of Chihuahua mobilized the state militia to support the Federal Army. Pancho Villa, now a colonel in the militia, was called up at this time. In mid-April, at the head of 400 irregular troops, he joined the forces commanded by Huerta. Huerta, however, viewed Villa as an ambitious competitor. During a visit to Huerta's headquarters in June 1912, after an incident in which he refused to return a number of stolen horses, Villa was imprisoned on charges of insubordination and robbery and sentenced to death. Raúl Madero, the President's brother, intervened to save Villa's life. Jailed in Mexico City, Villa escaped and fled to the United States, later to return and play a major role in the civil wars of 1913–1915.

There were other rebellions, one led by Bernardo Reyes and another by Félix Díaz, nephew of the former president, that were quickly put down and the generals jailed. They were both in Mexico City prisons and, despite their geographical separation, they were able to foment yet another rebellion in February 1913. This period came to be known as the Ten Tragic Days (La Decena Trágica), which ended with Madero's resignation and assassination and Huerta assuming the presidency. Although Madero had reason to distrust Victoriano Huerta, Madero placed him in charge of suppressing the Mexico City revolt as interim commander. He did not know that Huerta had been invited to join the conspiracy, but had initially held back. During the fighting that took place in the capital, the civilian population was subjected to artillery exchanges, street fighting and economic disruption, perhaps deliberately caused by the coup plotters to demonstrate that Madero was unable to keep order.

=== A military coup overthrows Madero: 9–22 February 1913 ===
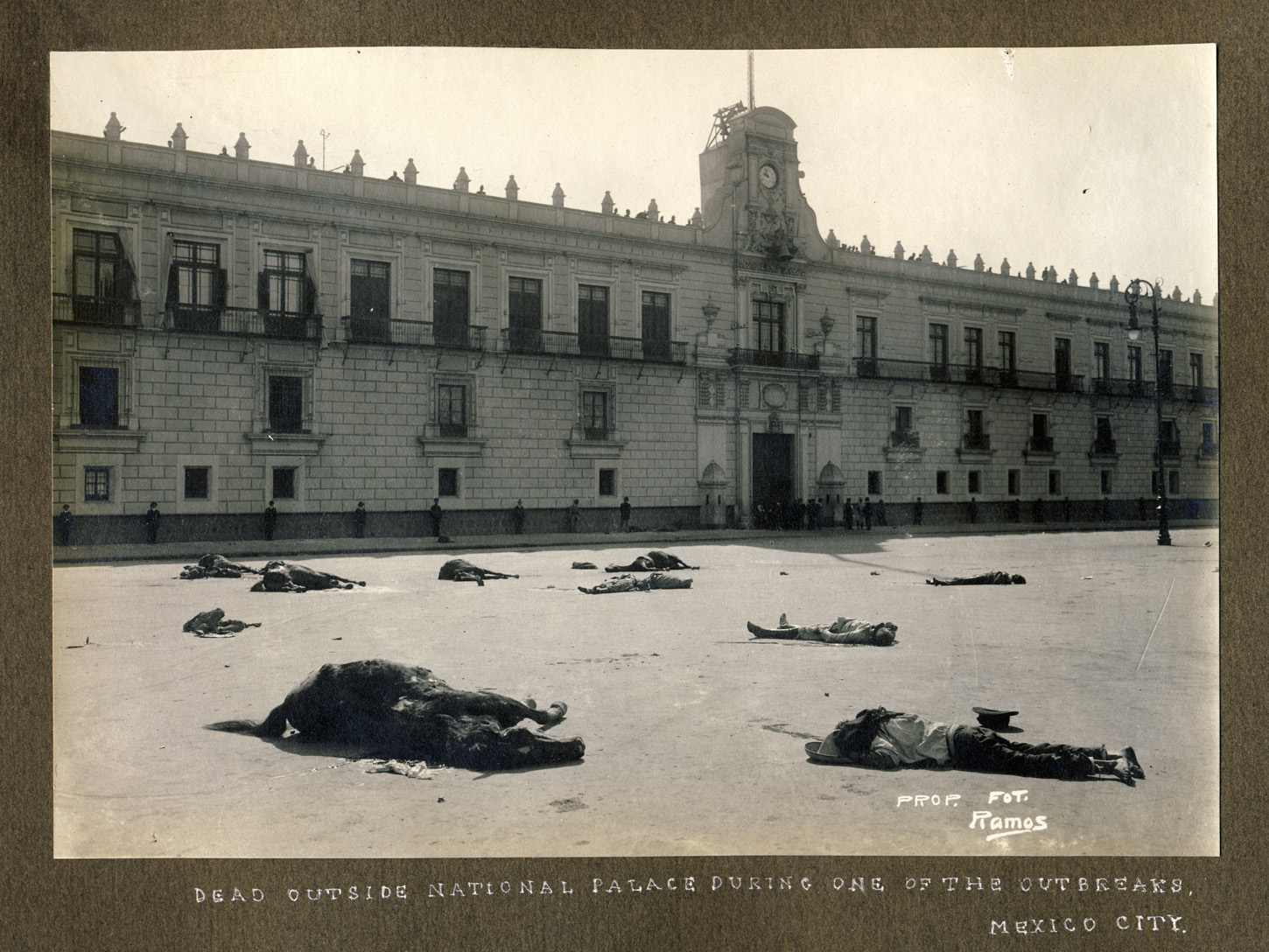
Corpses in front of the National Palace during the Ten Tragic Days. Photographer: Manuel Ramos.

The Madero presidency was unravelling, to no one's surprise except perhaps Madero's, whose support continued to deteriorate, even among his political allies. Madero's supporters in congress before the coup, the so-called Renovadores ("the renewers"), criticized him, saying, "The revolution is heading toward collapse and is pulling the government to which it gave rise down with it, for the simple reason that it is not governing with revolutionaries. Compromises and concessions to the supporters of the old [Díaz] regime are the main causes of the unsettling situation in which the government that emerged from the revolution finds itself ... The regime appears relentlessly bent on suicide."

Huerta, formally in charge of the defense of Madero's regime, allowed the rebels to hold the armory in Mexico City—the Ciudadela—while he consolidated his political power. He changed allegiance from Madero to the rebels under Félix Díaz (Bernardo Reyes having been killed on the first day of the open armed conflict). U.S. Ambassador Henry Lane Wilson, who had done all he could to undermine American confidence in Madero's presidency, brokered the Pact of the Embassy, which formalized the alliance between Félix Díaz and Huerta, with the backing of the United States. Huerta was to become provisional president following the resignations of Madero and his vice president, José María Pino Suárez. Rather than being sent into exile with their families, the two were murdered while being transported to prison—a shocking event, but one that did not prevent the Huerta regime's recognition by most world governments, with the notable exception of the U.S.

Historian Friedrich Katz considers Madero's retention of the Federal Army, which was defeated by the revolutionary forces and resulted in Díaz's resignation, "was the basic cause of his fall". His failure is also attributable to "the failure of the social class to which he belonged and whose interests he considered to be identical to those of Mexico: the liberal hacendados" (owners of large estates). Madero had created no political organization that could survive his death and had alienated and demobilized the revolutionary fighters who had helped bring him to power. In the aftermath of his assassination and Huerta's seizure of power via a military coup, former revolutionaries had no formal organization through which to raise opposition to Huerta.

=== Huerta regime and civil war: February 1913 – July 1914 ===
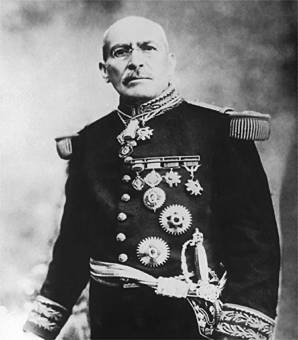
General Victoriano Huerta was a Federal Army commander who served President Francisco I. Madero (1911–1913) but joined with anti-Madero conspirators in ousting him.

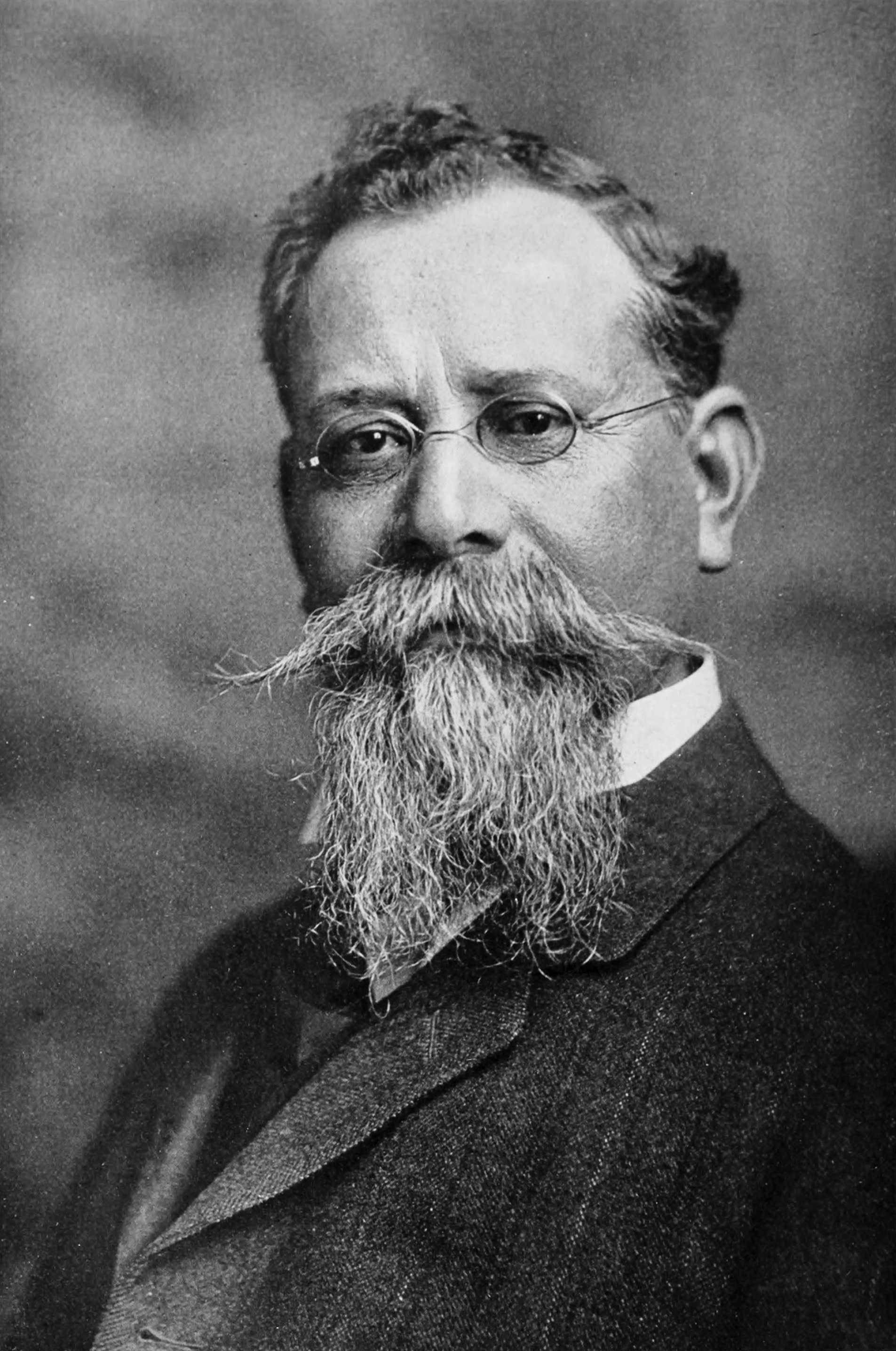
Venustiano Carranza, Governor of Coahuila, united northern forces of the Constitutionalist Army, with brilliant generals Obregón and Villa

Madero's "martyrdom accomplished what he was unable to do while alive: unite all the revolutionists under one banner." Within 16 months, revolutionary armies defeated the Federal Army and the Huerta regime fell. Like Porfirio Díaz, Huerta went into exile. The Federal Army was disbanded, leaving only revolutionary military forces.

Upon taking power, Huerta had moved swiftly to consolidate his hold in the North, having learned the lesson from Díaz's fall that the north was a crucial region to hold. Within a month of the coup, rebellions began to spread throughout Mexico, most prominently led by the governor of the state of Coahuila, Venustiano Carranza, along with Pablo González. Huerta expected state governors to fall into line with the new government. But Carranza and Abraham González, Governor of Chihuahua did not. Carranza issued the Plan of Guadalupe, a strictly political plan to reject the legitimacy of the Huerta government, and called on revolutionaries to take up arms. Revolutionaries who had brought Madero to power only to be dismissed in favor of the Federal Army eagerly responded to the call, most prominently Pancho Villa. Alvaro Obregón of Sonora, a successful rancher and businessman who had not participated in the Madero revolution, now joined the revolutionary forces in the north, the Constitutionalist Army under the Primer Jefe ("First Chief") Venustiano Carranza. Huerta had Governor González arrested and murdered, for fear he would foment rebellion. When northern General Pancho Villa became governor of Chihuahua in 1914, following the defeat of Huerta, he located González's bones and had them reburied with full honors. In Morelos, Emiliano Zapata continued his rebellion under the Plan of Ayala (while expunging the name of counter-revolutionary Pascual Orozco from it), calling for the expropriation of land and redistribution to peasants. Huerta offered peace to Zapata, who rejected it. The Huerta government was thus challenged by revolutionary forces in the north of Mexico and the strategic state of Morelos, just south of the capital.

Huerta's presidency is usually characterized as a dictatorship. From the point of view of revolutionaries at the time and the construction of historical memory of the Revolution, it is without any positive aspects. "Despite recent attempts to portray Victoriano Huerta as a reformer, there is little question that he was a self-serving dictator." There are few biographies of Huerta, but one strongly asserts that Huerta should not be labeled simply as a counter-revolutionary, arguing that his regime consisted of two distinct periods. From the coup in February 1913 up to October 1913, he attempted to legitimize his regime and demonstrate its legality by pursuing reformist policies. After October 1913, he dropped all attempts to rule within a legal framework and began murdering political opponents while battling revolutionary forces that had united in opposition to his regime.

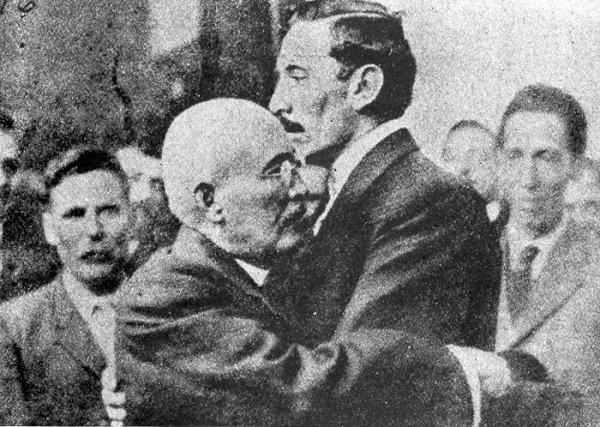
Victoriano Huerta (left) and Pascual Orozco (right). Emiliano Zapata disavowed Orozco when he joined Huerta.

Supporting the Huerta regime initially were business interests in Mexico, both foreign and domestic; landed elites; the Roman Catholic Church; and the German and British governments. The U.S. President Woodrow Wilson did not recognize the Huerta regime, since it had come to power by coup. Huerta and Carranza were in contact for two weeks immediately after the February coup, but they did not come to an agreement. Carranza then declared himself opposed to Huerta and became the leader of the anti-Huerta forces in the north. Huerta gained the support of revolutionary general Pascual Orozco, who had helped topple the Díaz regime, then rebelled against Madero because of his lack of action on agrarian issues. Huerta's first cabinet comprised men who had supported the February 1913 Pact of the Embassy, among them some who had supported Madero, such as Jesús Flores Magón; supporters of General Bernardo Reyes; supporters of Félix Díaz; and former Interim President Francisco León de la Barra.

During the counter-revolutionary regime of Huerta, the Catholic Church in Mexico initially supported him. "The Church represented a force for reaction, especially in the countryside." However, when Huerta cracked down on political parties and conservative opposition, he had "Gabriel Somellera, president of the [National] Catholic Party arrested; La Nación, which, like other Catholic papers, had protested Congress's dissolution and the rigged elections [of October 1913], locked horns with the official press and was finally closed down. El País, the main Catholic newspaper, survived for a time."

Huerta was even able to briefly muster the support of Andrés Molina Enríquez, author of The Great National Problems (Los grandes problemas nacionales), a key work urging land reform in Mexico. Huerta was seemingly deeply concerned with the issue of land reform, since it was a persistent spur of peasant unrest. Specifically, he moved to restore "ejido lands to the Yaquis and Mayos of Sonora and [advanced] proposals for distribution of government lands to small-scale farmers." When Huerta refused to move faster on land reform, Molina Enríquez disavowed the regime in June 1913, later going on to advise the 1917 constitutional convention on land reform.

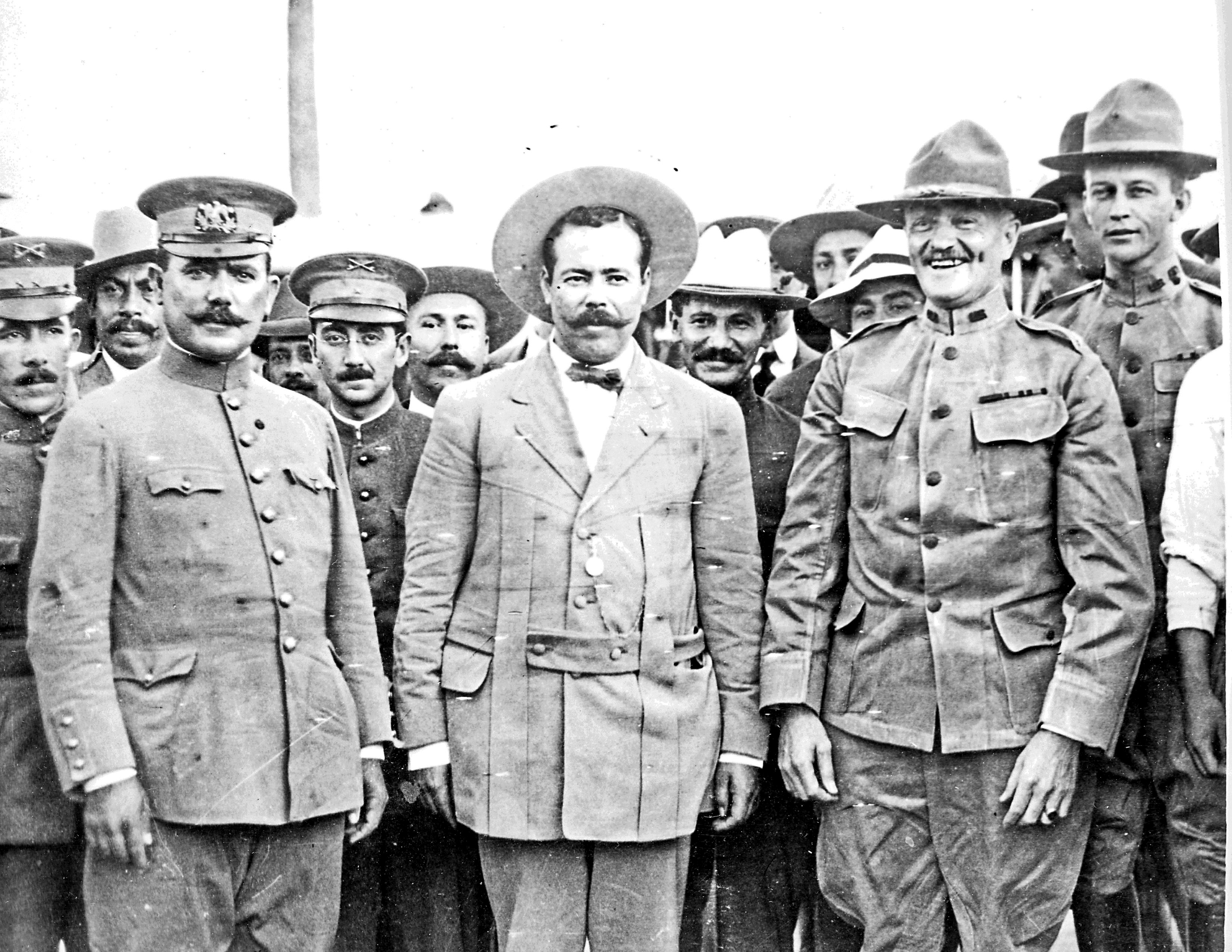
Constitutionalist Generals Obregón (left) and Pancho Villa (center) with U.S. Army General Pershing, posing after a 1914 meeting at Fort Bliss, Texas. After the ouster of Huerta, Villa split with Carranza, and was defeated by Obregón in 1915. In 1916, Villa attacked the United States and Pershing was dispatched in a failed attempt to capture him.

U.S. President Taft left the decision of whether to recognize the new government up to the incoming president, Woodrow Wilson. Despite the urging of American ambassador Henry Lane Wilson, who had played a key role in the coup d'état, President Wilson not only declined to recognize Huerta's government but first supplanted the ambassador by sending his "personal representative" John Lind, a progressive who sympathized with the Mexican revolutionaries, and the president recalled Ambassador Wilson. The United States lifted the arms embargo imposed by Taft in order to supply weapons to the landlocked rebels; while under the complete embargo Huerta had still been able to receive shipments from the British by sea. Wilson urged European powers to not recognize Huerta's government, and attempted to persuade Huerta to call prompt elections "and not present himself as a candidate". The United States offered Mexico a loan on the condition that Huerta accept the proposal. He refused. Lind "clearly threatened a military intervention in case the demands were not met".

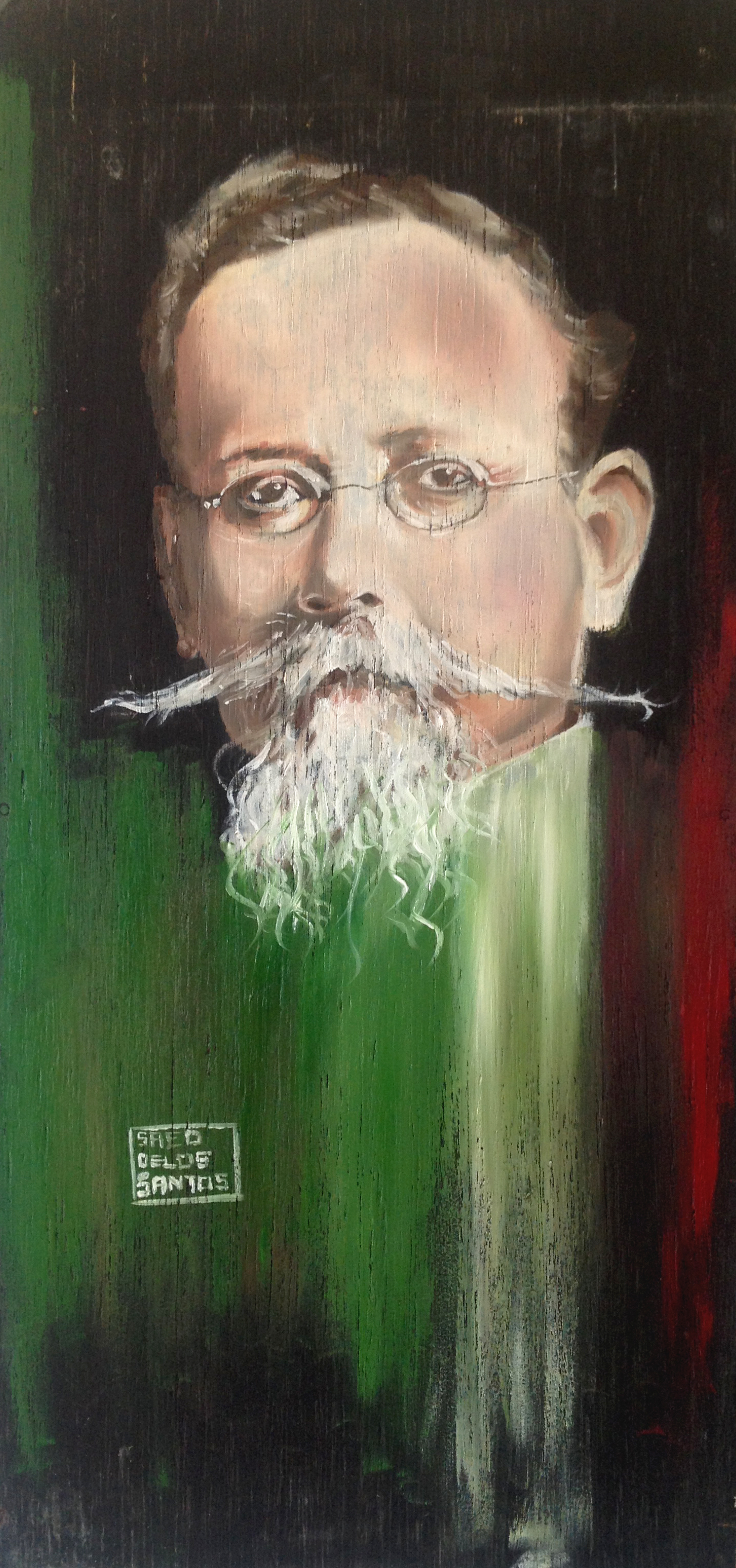
Oil portrait of Venustiano Carranza, governor of Coahuila.

In the summer of 1913, Mexican conservatives who had supported Huerta sought a constitutionally-elected, civilian alternative to Huerta, brought together in a body called the National Unifying Junta. Political parties proliferated in this period, a sign that democracy had taken hold, and there were 26 by the time of the October congressional elections. From Huerta's point of view, the fragmentation of the conservative political landscape strengthened his own position. For the country's conservative elite, "there was a growing disillusionment with Huerta, and disgust at his strong-arm methods." Huerta closed the legislature on 26 October 1913, having the army surround its building and arresting congressmen perceived to be hostile to his regime. Despite that, congressional elections went ahead, but given that congress was dissolved and some members were in jail, opposition candidates' fervor disappeared. The sham election "brought home to [Woodrow] Wilson's administration the fatuity of relying on elections to demonstrate genuine democracy." The October 1913 elections were the end of any pretension to constitutional rule in Mexico, with civilian political activity banned. Prominent Catholics were arrested and Catholic newspapers were suppressed.

Huerta militarized Mexico to a greater extent than it already was. When Huerta seized power in 1913, the army had on the books approximately 50,000 men, but Huerta mandated the number rise to 150,000, then 200,000 and, finally in spring 1914, 250,000. Raising that number of men in so short a time would not occur with volunteers, and the army resorted to the leva, forced conscription. The revolutionary forces had no problem with voluntary recruitment. Most Mexican men avoided government conscription at all costs and the ones dragooned into the forces were sent to areas far away from home and were reluctant to fight. Conscripts deserted, mutinied and attacked and murdered their officers.

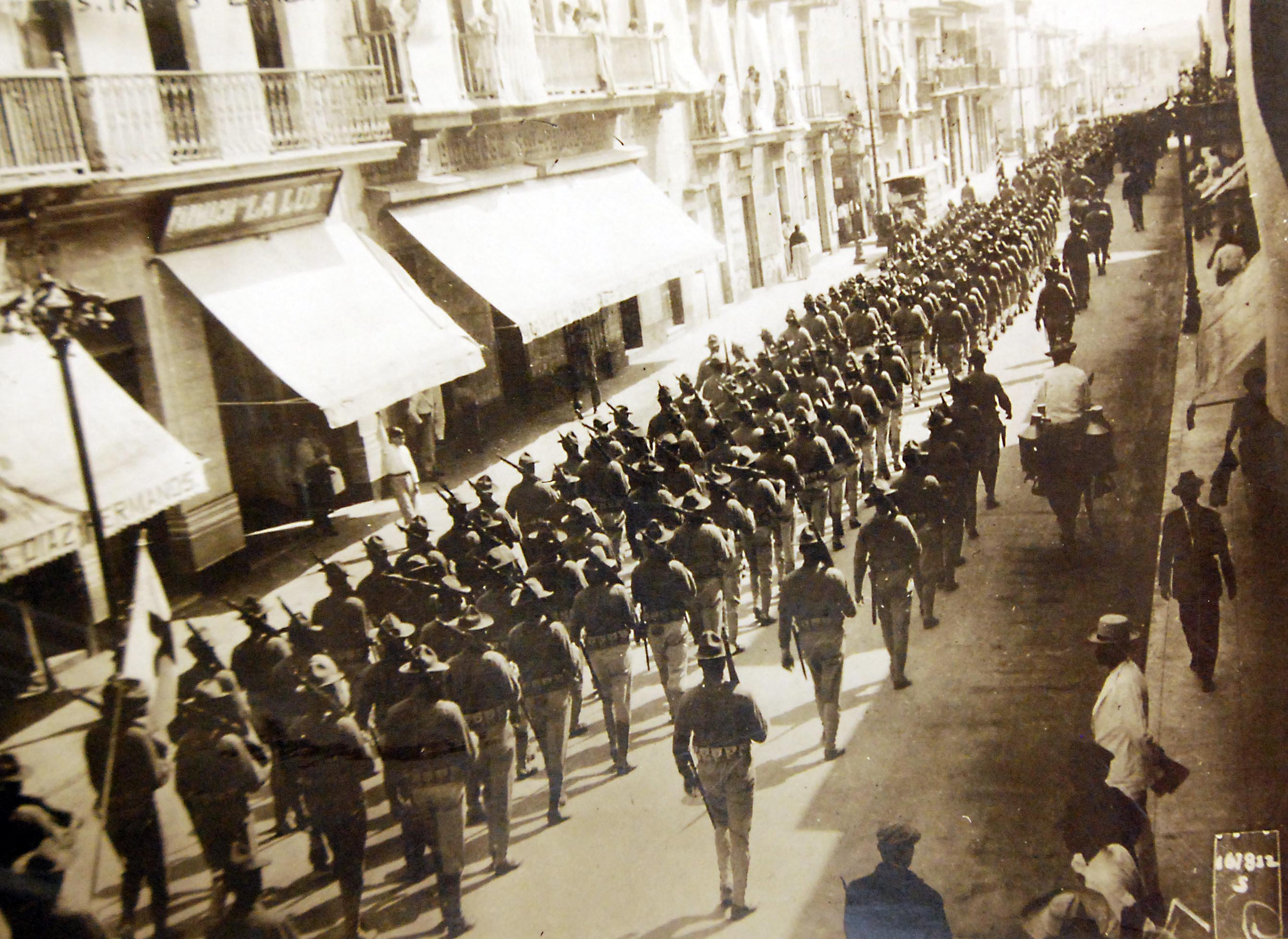
U.S. troops enter Veracruz in April 1914. Both Huerta and Carranza opposed the U.S. intervention

In April 1914 American opposition to Huerta culminated in the seizure and occupation of the port of Veracruz by U.S. Marines and sailors. Initially intended to prevent a German merchant vessel from delivering a shipment of arms to the Huerta regime, the muddled operation evolved into a seven-month stalemate resulting in the death of 193 Mexican soldiers, 19 American servicemen and an unknown number of civilians. The German ship landed its cargo—largely American-made rifles—in a deal brokered by American businessmen (at a different port). American forces eventually left Veracruz in the hands of the Carrancistas, but with lasting damage to U.S.-Mexican relations.

In Mexico's south, Zapata took Chilpancingo, Guerrero in mid-March; he followed this soon afterward with the capture of the Pacific coast port of Acapulco; Iguala; Taxco; and Buenavista de Cuellar. He confronted the federal garrisons in Morelos, the majority of which defected to him with their weapons. Finally he moved against the capital, by sending his subordinates into Mexico state.

Constitutionalist forces made major gains against the Federal Army. In early 1914 Pancho Villa had moved against the Federal Army in the border town of Ojinaga, Chihuahua, sending the federal soldiers fleeing to Fort Bliss, in the U.S. state of New Mexico. In mid-March he took Torreón, a well-defended railway hub city. After bitter fighting for the hills surrounding Torreón, and later point-blank bombardment, on April 3 Villa's troops entered the devastated city. The Federal Army made a last stand at San Pedro de las Colonias, only to be undone by squabbling between the two commanding officers, General Velasco and General Maas, over who had the higher rank. As of mid-April, Mexico City sat undefended before Constitutionalist forces under Villa. Obregón moved south from Sonora along the Pacific Coast. When his way was blocked by federal gunboats, Obregón attacked these boats with an airplane, an early use of an airplane for military purposes. In early July he defeated federal troops at Orendain, Jalisco, leaving 8,000 federals dead and capturing a large trove of armaments. He was now in a position to arrive at Mexico City ahead of Villa, who was diverted by orders from Carranza to take Saltillo. Carranza, the civilian First Chief, and Villa, the bold and successful commander of the Division of the North, were on the verge of splitting. Obregón, the other highly successful Constitutionalist general, sought to keep the northern coalition intact.

The Federal Army's defeats caused Huerta's position to continue to deteriorate and in mid-July 1914, he stepped down and fled to the Gulf Coast port of Puerto México, seeking to get himself and his family out of Mexico rather than face the fate of Madero. He turned to the German government, which had generally supported his presidency. The Germans were not eager to allow him to be transported into exile on one of their ships, but relented. Huerta carried "roughly half a million marks in gold with him" as well as paper currency and checks. In exile, Huerta sought to return to Mexico via the United States. American authorities arrested him and he was imprisoned in Fort Bliss, Texas. He died in January 1916, six months after going into exile.

Huerta's resignation marked the end of an era. The Federal Army, a spectacularly ineffective fighting force against the revolutionaries, ceased to exist. The revolutionary factions that had united in opposition to Huerta's regime now faced a new political landscape with the counter-revolutionaries decisively defeated. The revolutionary armies now contended for power and a new era of civil war began after an attempt at an agreement among the winners at a Convention of Aguascalientes.

=== Meeting of the winners, then civil war: 1914–1915 ===
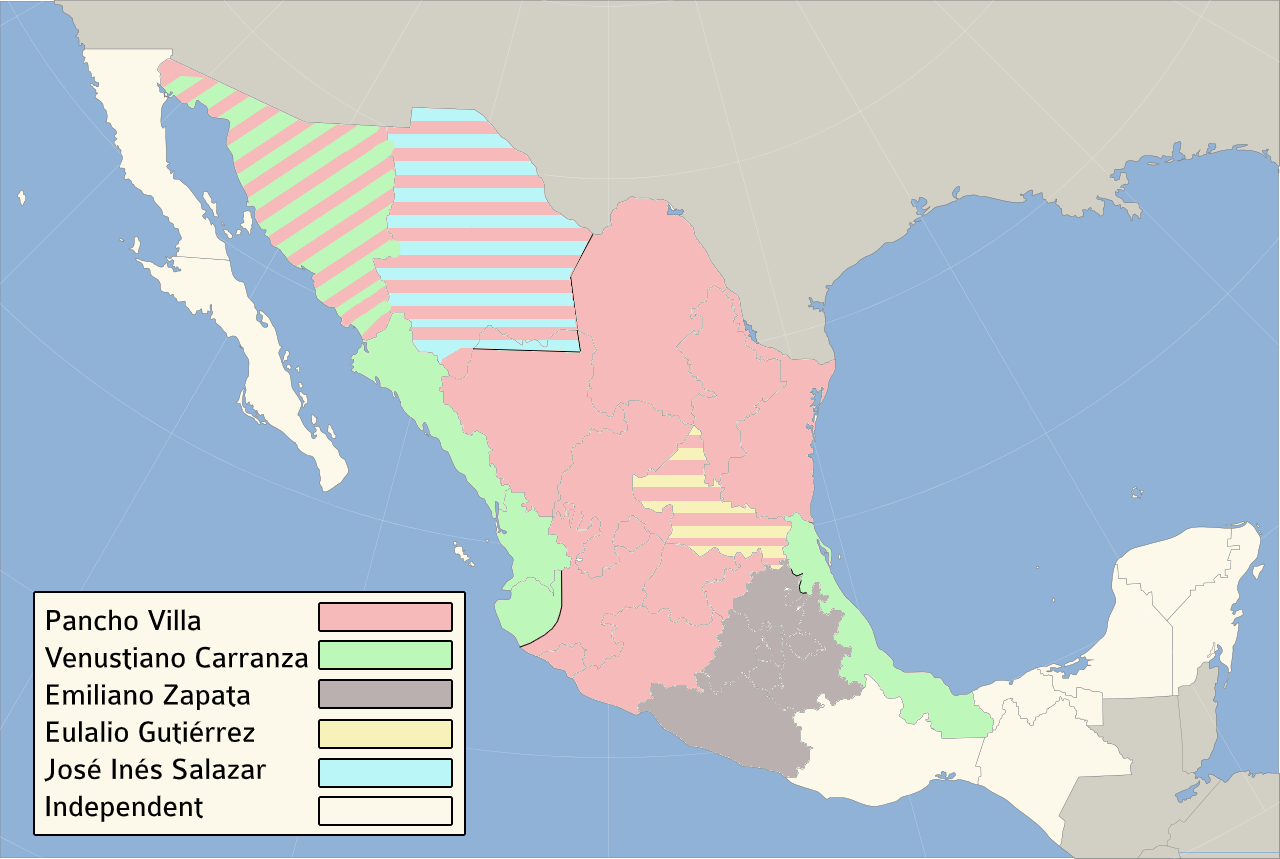
Map of zones of control during the Mexico Revolution as of early 1915, before Obregón defeated Villa.

With Huerta's ouster in July 1914 and the dissolution of the Federal Army in August, the revolutionary factions agreed to meet and make "a last-ditch effort to avert more intense warfare than that which unseated Huerta". Commander of the Division of the North, Pancho Villa, and the Division of the Northeast, Pablo González had drawn up the Pact of Torreón in early July, pushing for a more radical agenda than Carranza's Plan of Guadalupe. It also called for a meeting of revolutionary generals to decide Mexico's political future.

Carranza called for a meeting in October 1914 in Mexico City, which he now controlled with Obregón, but other revolutionaries opposed to Carranza's influence successfully moved the venue to Aguascalientes. The Convention of Aguascalientes did not, in fact, reconcile the various victorious factions in the Mexican Revolution. The break between Carranza and Villa became definitive during the Convention. "Carranza spurned it, and Villa effectively hijacked it. Mexico's lesser caudillos were forced to choose" between those two forces. It was a brief pause in revolutionary violence before another all-out period of civil war ensued.

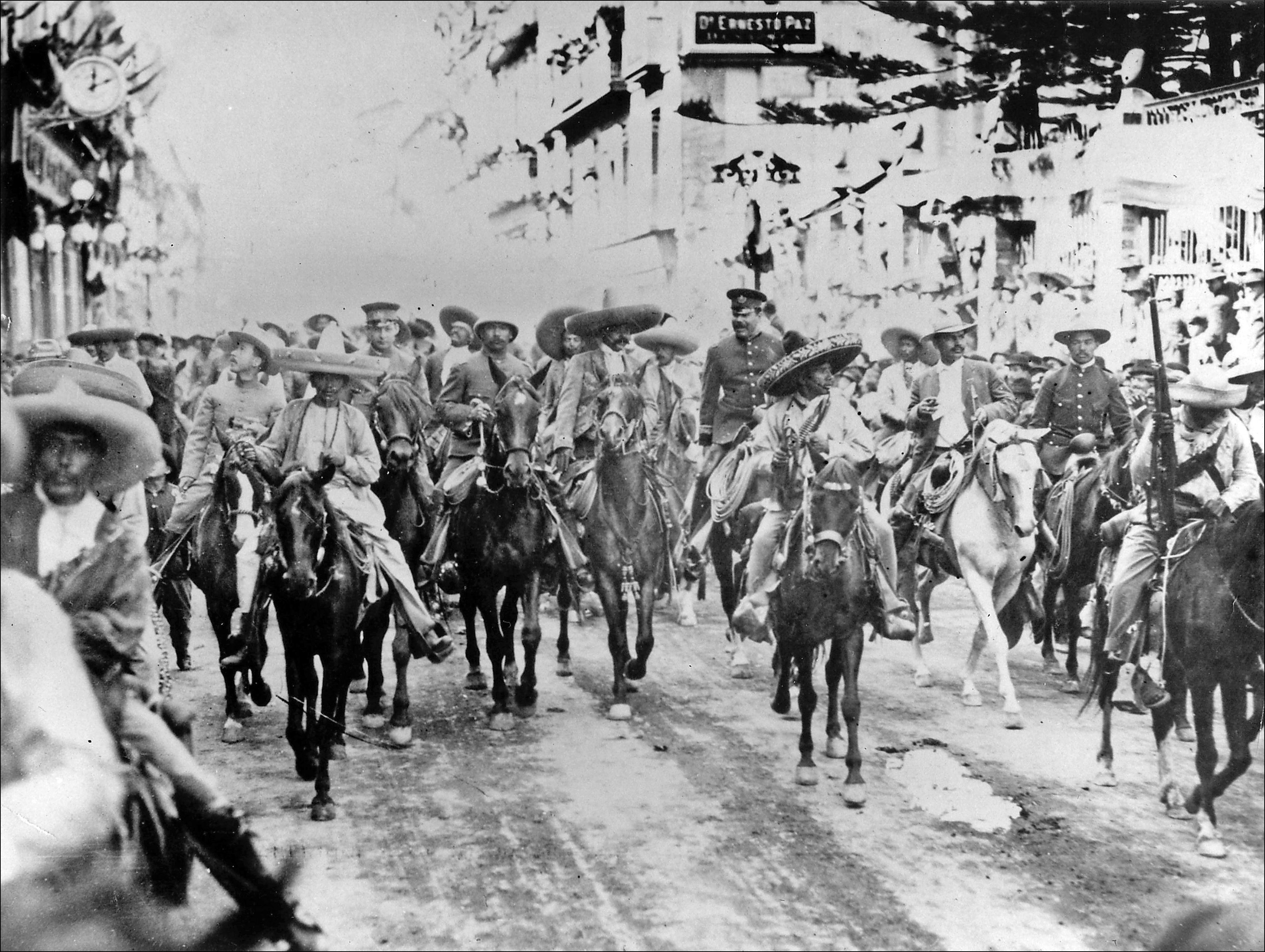
Pancho Villa and Emiliano Zapata

Carranza had expected to be confirmed in his position as First Chief of revolutionary forces, but his supporters "lost control of the proceedings". Opposition to Carranza was strongest in areas where there were popular and fierce demands for reform, particularly in Chihuahua where Villa was powerful, and in Morelos where Zapata held sway. The Convention of Aguascalientes brought that opposition out in an open forum.

The revolutionary generals of the Convention called on Carranza to resign executive power. Although he agreed to do so, he laid out conditions for it. He would resign if both Pancho Villa and Emiliano Zapata, his main rivals for power, would resign and go into exile, and that there should be a so-called pre-constitutionalist government "that would take charge of carrying out the social and political reforms the country needs before a fully constitutional government is re-established."

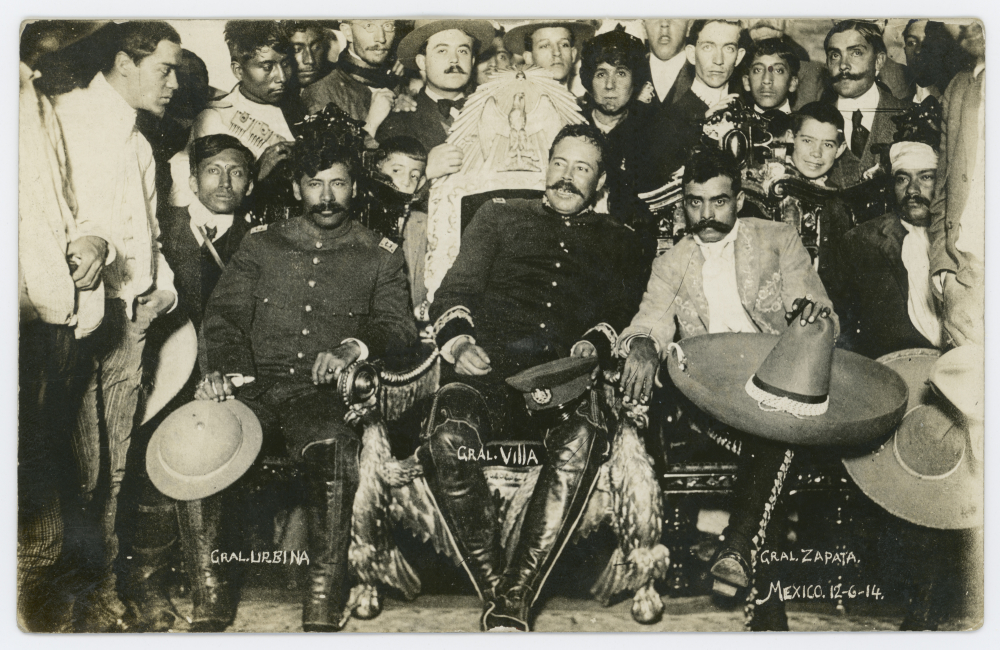
Pancho Villa and Emiliano Zapata at the National Palace in Mexico City on December 6, 1914. Villa is seated in the presidential chair conversing with Zapata; Tomás Urbina, Otilio Montaño, and Rodolfo Fierro are also pictured.

Rather than First Chief Carranza being named president of Mexico at the convention, General Eulalio Gutiérrez was chosen for a term of 20 days. The Convention declared Carranza in rebellion against it. Civil war resumed, this time between revolutionary armies that had fought in a united cause to oust Huerta in 1913–1914. During the Convention, Constitutionalist General Álvaro Obregón had attempted to be a moderating force and had been the one to convey the Convention's call for Carranza to resign.

The lines were now drawn. When the Convention forces declared Carranza in rebellion against it, Obregón supported Carranza rather than Villa and Zapata. Villa and Zapata went into a loose alliance. Their forces moved separately on Mexico City, and took it when Carranza's forces evacuated it in December 1914 for Veracruz. The famous picture of Zapata and Villa in the National Palace, with Villa sitting in the presidential chair, is a classic image of the Revolution. Villa is reported to have said to Zapata that the presidential chair "is too big for us".

In practice, the alliance between Villa and Zapata as the Army of the Convention did not function beyond this initial victory against the Constitutionalists. Villa and Zapata left the capital, with Zapata returning to his southern stronghold in Morelos, where he continued to engage in warfare under the Plan of Ayala. Lacking a firm center of power and leadership, the Convention government was plagued by instability. Villa was the real power emerging from the Convention, and he prepared to strengthen his position by winning a decisive victory against the Constitutionalist Army.

Villa had a well-earned reputation as a fierce and successful general, and the combination of forces arrayed against Carranza by Villa, other northern generals and Zapata was larger than the Constitutionalist Army, so it was not at all clear that Carranza's faction would prevail. He did have the advantage of the loyalty of General Álvaro Obregón. Despite Obregón's moderating actions at the Convention of Aguascalientes, even trying to persuade Carranza to resign his position, he ultimately sided with Carranza.

Another advantage of Carranza's position was the Constitutionalists' control of Veracruz, even though the United States still occupied it. The United States had concluded that both Villa and Zapata were too radical and hostile to its interests and sided with the moderate Carranza in the factional fighting. The U.S. timed its exit from Veracruz, brokered at the Niagara Falls peace conference, to benefit Carranza and allowed munitions to flow to the Constitutionalists. The U.S. granted Carranza's government diplomatic recognition in October 1915.

The rival armies of Villa and Obregón clashed in April 1915 in the Battle of Celaya, which lasted from the sixth to the 15th. The frontal cavalry charges of Villa's forces were met by the shrewd, modern military tactics of Obregón. The victory of the Constitutionalists was complete, and Carranza emerged as the political leader of Mexico with a victorious army to keep him in that position. Villa retreated north. Carranza and the Constitutionalists consolidated their position as the winning faction, with Zapata remaining a threat until his assassination in 1919. Villa also remained a threat to the Constitutionalists, complicating their relationship with the United States when elements of Villa's forces raided Columbus, New Mexico, in March 1916, prompting the U.S. to launch a punitive expedition into Mexico in an unsuccessful attempt to capture him.

=== Constitutionalists in power under Carranza: 1915–1920 ===
Mexico at the end of 1915, with the Constitutionalists holding the most territory

Carranza's 1913 Plan of Guadalupe was narrowly political, designed to unite the anti-Huerta forces in the north. But once Huerta was ousted, the Federal Army dissolved, and former Constitutionalist Pancho Villa defeated, Carranza sought to consolidate his position. The Constitutionalists retook Mexico City, which had been held by the Zapatistas, and held it permanently. He did not take the title of provisional or interim President of Mexico, since in doing so he would have been ineligible to become the constitutional president. Until the promulgation of the 1917 Constitution his was framed as the "pre-constitutional government."

In October 1915, the U.S. recognized Carranza's government as the de facto ruling power, following Obregón's victories. This gave Carranza's Constitutionalists legitimacy internationally and access to the legal flow of arms from the U.S. The Carranza government still had active opponents, including Villa, who retreated north. Zapata remained active in the south, even though he was losing support, Zapata remained a threat to the Carranza regime until his assassination by order of Carranza on 10 April 1919. Disorder and violence in the countryside was largely due to anti-Carranza forces, but banditry as well as military and police misconduct contributed to the unsettled situation. The government's inability to keep order gave an opening to supporters of the old order headed by Félix Díaz (nephew of former President Porfirio Diaz). Some 36 generals of the dissolved Federal Army stood with Díaz.

The Constitutionalist Army was renamed the "Mexican National Army" and Carranza sent some of its most able generals to eliminate threats. In Morelos, he sent General Pablo González to fight Zapata's Liberating Army of the South. Morelos was very close to Mexico City, so Zapata's control of it and parts of the adjacent state of Puebla made Carranza's government vulnerable. Constitutionalist Army soldiers assassinated Zapata in an ambush in 1919, after their commanding officer tricked Zapata by pretending that he intended to defect to Zapata's side. Carranza sent General Francisco Murguía and General Manuel M. Diéguez to track down and eliminate Villa, but they were unsuccessful. They did capture and execute one of Villa's top men, General Felipe Angeles, the only general of the old Federal Army to join the revolutionaries. Revolutionary generals asserted their "right to rule", having been victorious in the Revolution, but "they ruled in a manner which was a credit neither to themselves, their institution, nor the Carranza government. More often than not, they were predatory, venal, cruel and corrupt." The system of central government control over states that Díaz had created over decades had broken down during the revolutionary fighting. Autonomous fiefdoms arose in which governors simply ignored orders by the Carranza government. One of these was Governor of Sonora, General Plutarco Elías Calles, who later joined in the 1920 successful coup against Carranza.

The 1914 Pact of Torreón had contained far more radical language and promises of land reform and support for peasants and workers than Carranza's original plan. Carranza issued the "Additions to the Plan of Guadalupe", which for the first time promised significant reform. He also issued an agrarian reform law in 1915, drafted by Luis Cabrera, sanctioning the return of all village lands illegally seized in contravention of an 1856 law passed under Benito Juárez. The Carranza reform declared village lands were to be divided among individuals, aiming at creating a class of small holders, and not to revive the old structure of communities of communal landholders. In practice, land was transferred not to villagers, but rather redistributed to Constitutional army generals, and created new large-scale enterprises as rewards to the victorious military leaders.

Carranza did not move on land reform, despite his rhetoric. Rather, he returned confiscated estates to their owners. Not only did he oppose large-scale land reform, he vetoed laws that would have increased agricultural production by giving peasants temporary access to lands not under cultivation. In places where peasants had fought for land reform, Carranza's policy was to repress them and deny their demands. In the southeast, where hacienda owners held strong, Carranza sent the most radical of his supporters, Francisco José Múgica in Tabasco and Salvador Alvarado in Yucatan, to mobilize peasants and be a counterweight to the hacienda owners. After taking control of Yucatán in 1915, Salvador Alvarado organized a large Socialist Party and carried out extensive land reform. He confiscated the large landed estates and redistributed the land in smaller plots to the liberated peasants. Maximo Castillo, a revolutionary brigadier general from Chihuahua was frustrated by the slow pace of land reform under the Madero presidency. He ordered the subdivision of six haciendas belonging to Luis Terrazas, which were given to sharecroppers and tenants.

Rebel armies between 1916 and 1920.

Carranza's relationship with the United States had initially benefited from its recognition of his government, with the Constitutionalist Army being able to buy arms. In 1915 and early 1916, there is evidence that Carranza was seeking a loan from the U.S. with the backing of American bankers and a formal alliance with the U.S. Mexican nationalists in Mexico were seeking a stronger stance against the colossus of the north, by taxing foreign holdings and limiting their influence. Villa's raid against Columbus, New Mexico in March 1916, ended the possibility of a closer relationship with the U.S. Under heavy pressure from public opinion in the U.S. to punish the attackers (stoked mainly by the papers of yellow journalism publisher William Randolph Hearst, who owned a large estate in Mexico), American President Woodrow Wilson sent General John J. Pershing and around 5,000 troops into Mexico in an attempt to capture Villa.

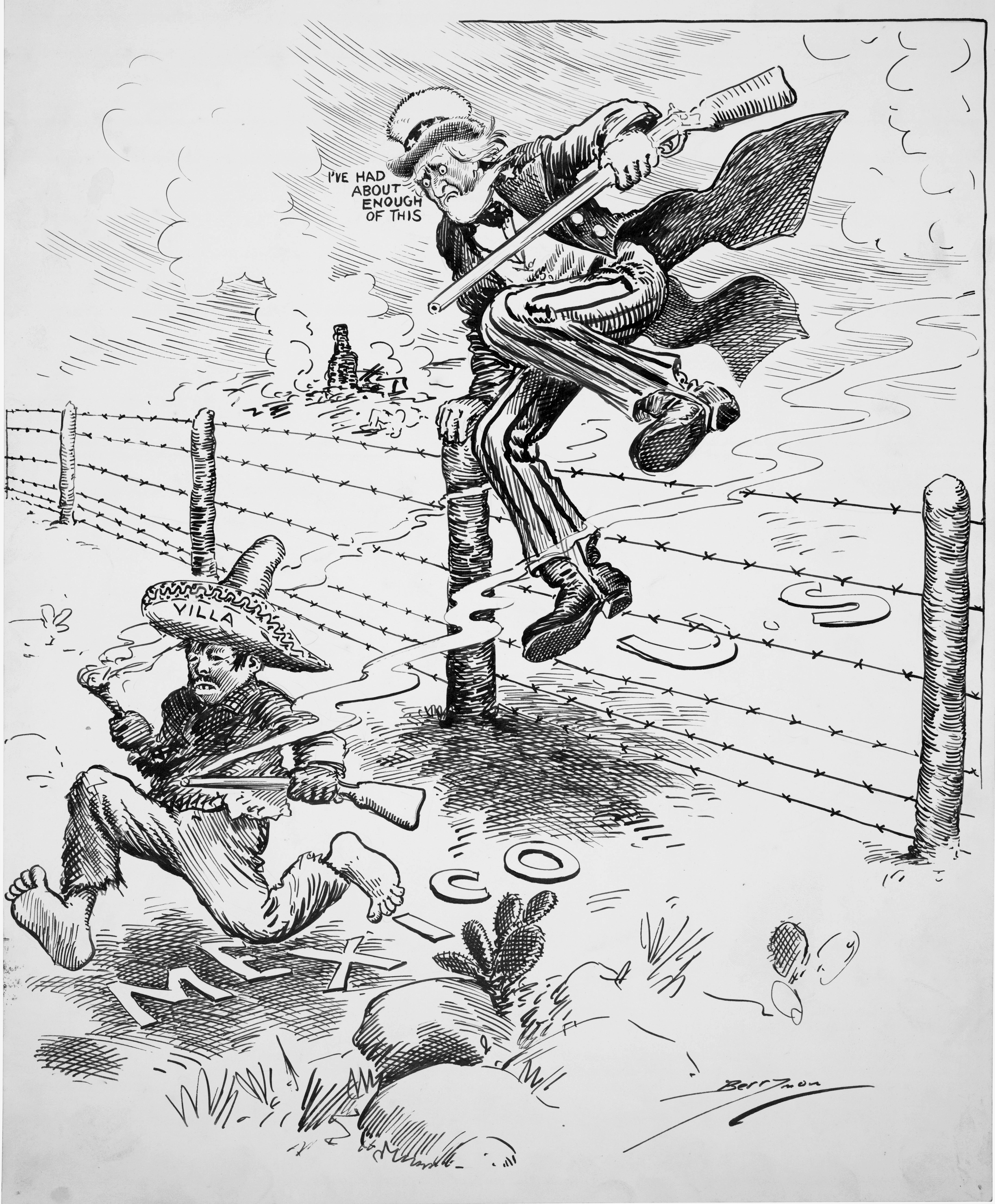
Uncle Sam entering Mexico in 1916 to punish Pancho Villa.

The U.S. Army intervention, known as the Punitive Expedition, was limited to the western Sierras of Chihuahua. From the Mexican perspective, as much as Carranza sought the elimination of his rival Villa, but as a Mexican nationalist he could not countenance the extended U.S. incursion into its sovereign territory. Villa knew the inhospitable terrain intimately and operating with guerrilla tactics, he had little trouble evading his U.S. Army pursuers. Villa was deeply entrenched in the mountains of northern Mexico and knew the terrain too well to be captured. American General John J. Pershing could not continue with his unsuccessful mission; declaring victory the troops returned to the U.S. after nearly a year. They were shortly thereafter deployed to Europe when the U.S. entered World War I on the side of the Allies. The Punitive Mission not only damaged the fragile United States-Mexico relationship, but also caused a rise in anti-American sentiment among the Mexicans. Carranza asserted Mexican sovereignty and forced the U.S. to withdraw in 1917

With the outbreak of World War I in Europe in 1914, foreign powers with significant economic and strategic interests in Mexico—particularly the U.S., Great Britain and Germany—made efforts to sway Mexico to their side, but Mexico maintained a policy of neutrality. In the Zimmermann Telegram, a coded cable from the German government to Carranza's government, Germany attempted to draw Mexico into war with the United States, which was itself neutral at the time. Germany hoped to draw American troops from deployment to Europe and as a reward in the event of a German victory to return the territory lost to Mexico to the U.S. in the Mexican–American War. Carranza did not pursue this policy, but the leaking of the telegram pushed the U.S. into war against Germany in 1917.

=== 1917 Constitution ===
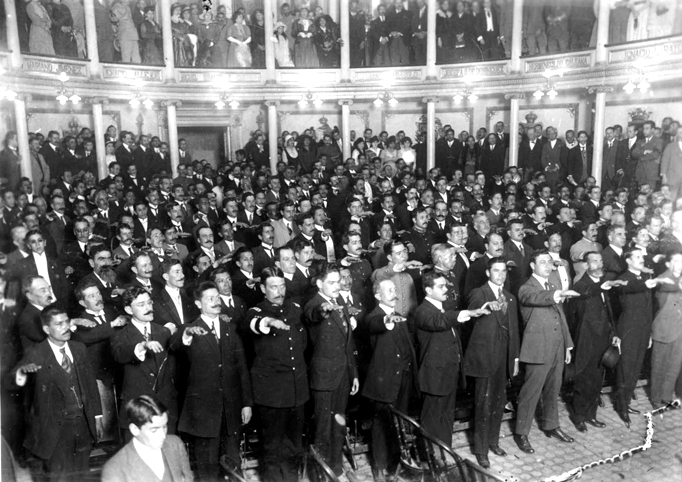
The new constitution was approved on 5 February 1917. This picture shows the Constituent Congress of 1917 swearing fealty to the new Constitution

The Constitutionalist Army fought in the name of the 1857 Constitution promulgated by liberals during the Reform era, sparking a decade-long armed conflict between liberals and conservatives. In contrast, the 1917 Constitution came at the culmination of revolutionary struggle. Drafting a new constitution was not a given at the outbreak of the Revolution. Carranza's 1913 Plan of Guadalupe was a narrow political plan to unite Mexicans against the Huerta regime and named Carranza as the head of the Constitutionalist Army. Increasingly revolutionaries called for radical reform. Carranza had consolidated power and his advisers persuaded him that a new constitution would better accomplish incorporating major reforms than a piecemeal revision of the 1857 constitution.

In 1916 Carranza was only acting president at the time, and the expectation was to hold presidential elections. He called for a constituent congress to draft a new document based on liberal and revolutionary principles. Labor had supported the Constitutionalists and Red Battalions had fought against the Zapatistas, the peasant revolutionaries of Morelos. As revolutionary violence subsided in 1916, leaders of the Constitutionalist faction met in Querétaro to revise the 1857 constitution. The delegates were elected by jurisdiction and population, with the exclusion of those who served the Huerta regime, continued to follow Villa after the split with Carranza, as well as Zapatistas. The election of delegates was to frame the creation of the new constitution as the result of popular participation. Carranza provided a draft revision for the delegates to consider.

Once the convention was in session after disputes about delegates, delegates reviewed Carranza's draft constitution. That document was a minor revision of the 1857 constitution and included none of the social, economic, and political demands for which revolutionary forces fought and died. The convention was divided between conservatives, mostly politicians who had supported Madero and then Carranza, and progressives, who were soldiers who had fought in revolutionary battles. The progressives, deemed radical Jacobins by the conservatives, "sought to integrate deep political and social reforms into the political structure of the country." making principles for which many of the revolutionaries had fought into law.

The Mexican Constitution of 1917 was strongly nationalist, giving the government the power to expropriate foreign ownership of resources and enabling land reform (Article 27). It also had a strong code protecting organized labor (Article 123) and extended state power over the Roman Catholic Church in Mexico in its role in education (Article 3).

Villistas and Zapatistas were excluded from the Constituent Congress, but their political challenge pushed the delegates to radicalize the Constitution, which in turn was far more radical than Carranza himself. While he was elected constitutional president in 1917, he did not implement its most revolutionary elements, particularly those dealing with land reform. Carranza came from the old Porfirian landowning class and was repulsed by peasant demand for redistribution of land and their expectation that land seized would not revert to their previous owners.

Although revolutionary generals were not part formal delegates to the convention, Álvaro Obregón indirectly, then directly, sided with the progressives against Carranza. In historian Frank Tannenbaum's assessment, "The Constitution was written by the soldiers of the Revolution, not by the lawyers, who were there [at the convention], but were generally in opposition." The constitution was drafted and ratified quickly, in February 1917. In December 1916, Villa had captured the major northern city of Torreón, with Obregón especially realizing that Villa was a continuing threat to the Constitutionalist regime. Zapata and his peasant followers in Morelos also never put down their guns and remained a threat to the government in Mexico City. Incorporating radical aspects of Villa's program and the Zapatistas' Plan of Ayala, the constitution became a way to outflank the two opposing revolutionary factions.

Carranza was elected president under the new constitution, and once formally in office, largely ignored or actively undermined the more radical aspects of the constitution. Obregón returned to Sonora and began building a power base that would launch his presidential campaign in 1919, which included the new labor organization headed by Luis N. Morones, the Regional Confederation of Mexican Workers (CROM). Carranza increasingly lost support of labor, crushing strikes against his government. Carranza did not move forward on land reform, fueling increasing opposition from peasants. In an attempt to suppress the continuing armed opposition conflict in Morelos, Carranza sent General Pablo González with troops. Going further, Carranza ordered the assassination of Emiliano Zapata in 1919. It was a huge blow, but Zapatista General Genovevo de la O continued to lead the armed struggle there.

=== Emiliano Zapata and the Revolution in Morelos ===
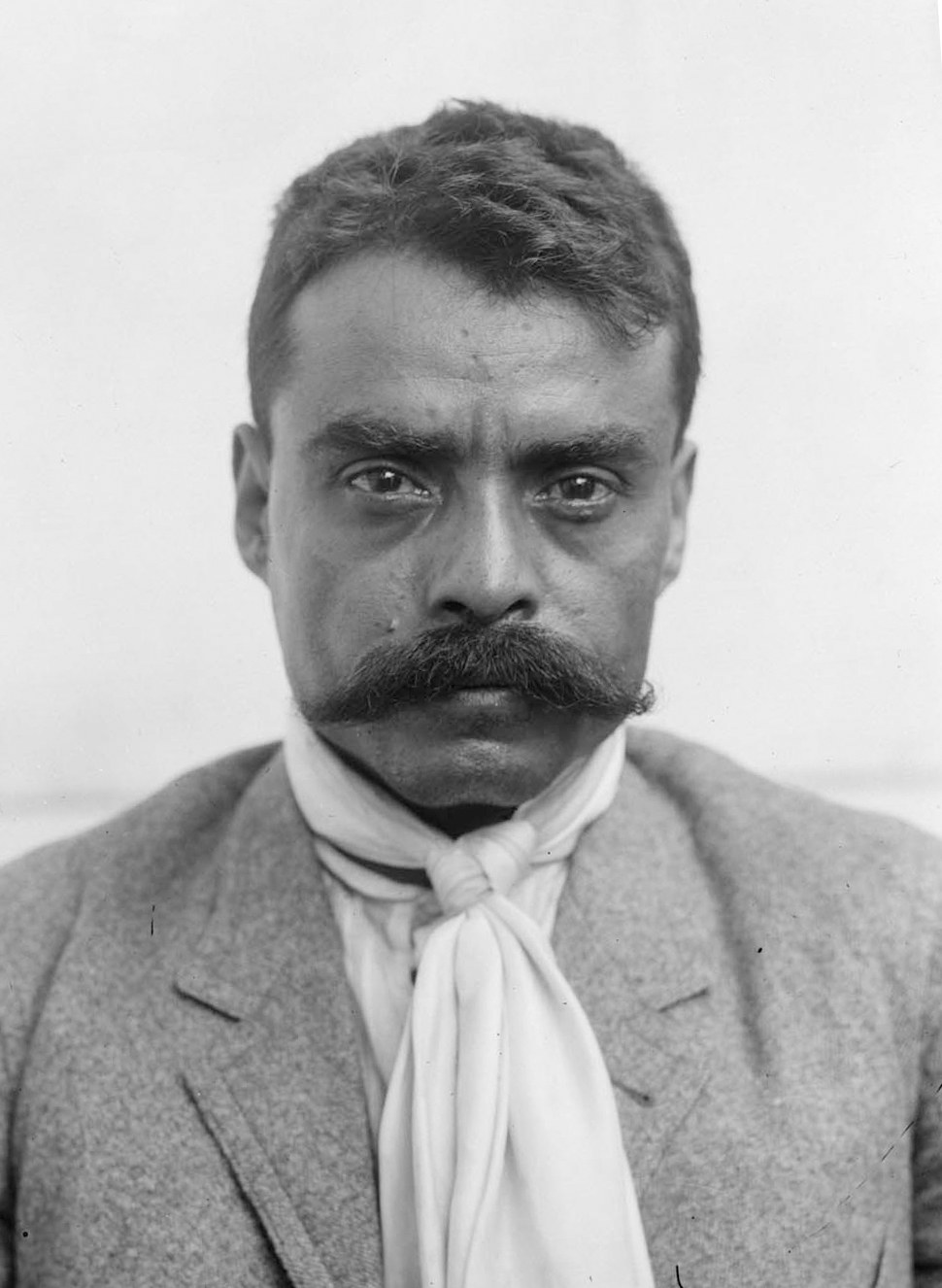
Emiliano Zapata

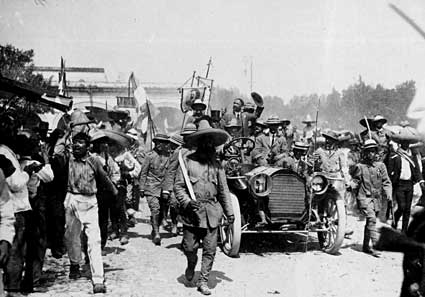
Francisco I. Madero, Emiliano Zapata, in Cuernavaca. Zapata rebelled against Madero in 1911 because of Madero's slowness in implementing land reform

From the late Porfiriato until his assassination by an agent of President Carranza in 1919, Emiliano Zapata played an important role in the Mexican Revolution, the only revolutionary of first rank from southern Mexico. His home territory in Morelos was of strategic importance just south of Mexico City. Of the revolutionary factions, it was the most homogeneous, with most fighters being free peasants and only few peons on haciendas. With no industry to speak of in Morelos, there were no industrial workers in the movement and no middle-class participants. A few intellectuals supported the Zapatistas. The Zapatistas' armed opposition movement just south of the capital needed to be heeded by those in power in Mexico City. Unlike northern Mexico, close to the U.S. border and access to arms sales from there, the Zapatista territory in Morelos was geographically isolated from access to arms. The Zapatistas did not appeal for support to international interests nor play a role in international politics the way Pancho Villa, the other major populist leader, did. The movement's goal was for land reform in Morelos and restoration of the rights of communities. The Zapatistas were divided into guerrilla fighting forces that joined together for major battles before returning to their home villages. Zapata was not a peasant himself but led peasants in his home state in regionally concentrated warfare to regain village lands and return to subsistence agriculture. Morelos was the only region where land reform was enacted during the years of fighting.

Zapata initially supported Madero, since his Plan de San Luis Potosí had promised land reform. But Madero negotiated a settlement with the Díaz regime that continued its power. Once elected in November 1911, Madero did not move on land reform, prompting Zapata to rebel against him and draft the Plan of Ayala (1911).

After Madero's overthrow and murder, Zapata disavowed his previous admiration for Pascual Orozco and directed warfare against the Huerta government, as did northern states of Mexico in the Constitutionalist movement, but Zapata did not ally or coordinate with it. With the defeat of Huerta in July 1914, Zapata loosely allied with Pancho Villa, who had split from Venustiano Carranza and the Constitutionalist Army. The loose Zapata-Villa alliance lasted until Obregón decisively defeated Villa in a series of battles in 1915, including the Battle of Celaya. Zapata continued to oppose the Constitutionalists, but lost support in his own area and attempted to entice defectors back to his movement. That was a fatal error. He was ambushed and killed on 10 April 1919 by agents of now President Venustiano Carranza. Photos were taken of his corpse, demonstrating that he had indeed been killed.

Although Zapata was assassinated, the agrarian reforms that peasants themselves enacted in Morelos were impossible to reverse. The central government came to terms with that state of affairs. Zapata had fought for land and for those who tilled it in Morelos and succeeded. His credentials as a steadfast revolutionary made him an enduring hero of the Revolution. His name and image were invoked in the 1994 uprising in Chiapas, with the Zapatista Army of National Liberation.

=== The last successful coup: 1920 ===
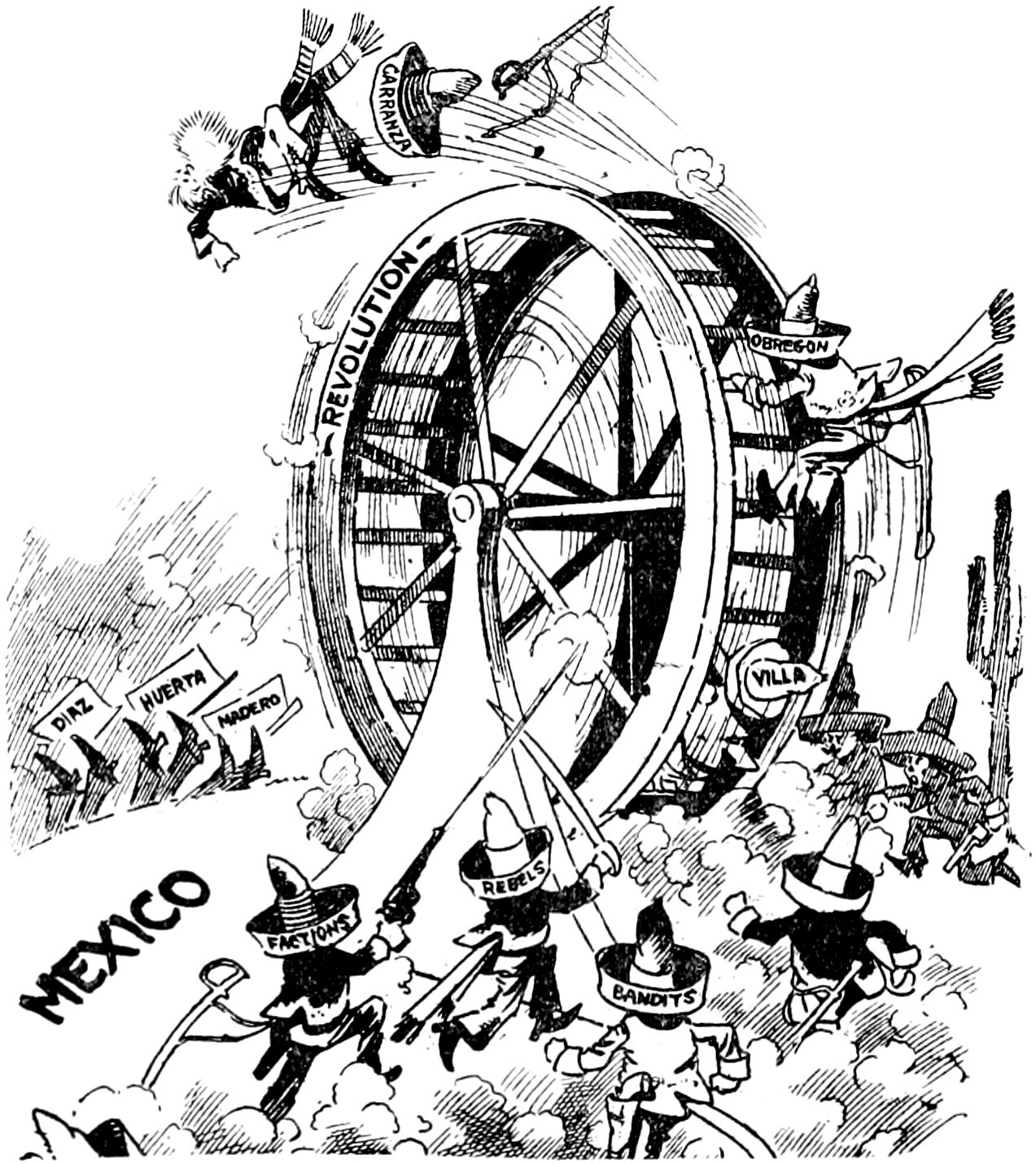
1920 cartoon published in the U.S. as Carranza was ousted

Even as Carranza's political authority was waning, he attempted to impose Mexico's ambassador to the U.S., Ignacio Bonillas, as his successor. Under the Plan of Agua Prieta, a triumvirate of Sonoran generals, Álvaro Obregón, Plutarco Elías Calles, and Adolfo de la Huerta, with elements from the military and labor supporters in the CROM, rose in successful rebellion against Carranza, the last successful coup of the revolution. Carranza fled Mexico City by train toward Veracruz, but continued on horseback and died in an ambush, perhaps an assassination, but also possibly by suicide. Carranza's attempt to impose his choice was considered a betrayal of the Revolution.

"Obregón and the Sonorans, the architects of Carranza's rise and fall, shared his hard headed opportunism, but they displayed a better grasp of the mechanisms of popular mobilization, allied to social reform, that would form the bases of a durable revolutionary regime after 1920." The interim government of Adolfo de la Huerta negotiated Pancho Villa's surrender in 1920, rewarding him with an hacienda where he lived in peace until he floated political interest in the 1924 election. Villa was assassinated in July 1923. Álvaro Obregón was elected president in October 1920, the first of a string of revolutionary generals – Calles, Rodríguez, Cárdenas, and Ávila Camacho—to hold the presidency until 1946, when Miguel Alemán, the son of a revolutionary general, was elected.

=== Consolidation of the Revolution: 1920–1940 ===
The period 1920–1940 is generally considered to be one of revolutionary consolidation, with the leaders seeking to return Mexico to the level of development it had reached in 1910, but under new parameters of state control. Authoritarian tendencies rather than liberal democratic principles characterized the period, with generals of the revolution holding the presidency and designating their successors. Revolutionary generals continued to revolt against the new political arrangements, particularly at the juncture of an election. General Adolfo de la Huerta rose in rebellion in 1923, contesting Obregón's choice of Calles as his successor; Generals Arnulfo Gómez and Francisco Serrano revolted in 1928, contesting Obregón's bid for a second term as president; and General José Gonzalo Escobar revolted in 1929 against Calles, who remained a power behind the presidency with the assassination of Obregón in 1928. All these revolts were unsuccessful. In the late 1920s, anticlerical provisions of the 1917 Constitution were stringently enforced, leading to a major grassroots uprising against the government, the bloody Cristero War that lasted from 1926 to 1929. Although the period is characterized as a consolidation of the Revolution, who ruled Mexico and the policies the government pursued were met with violence.

==== Sonoran generals in the presidency: 1920–1928 ====
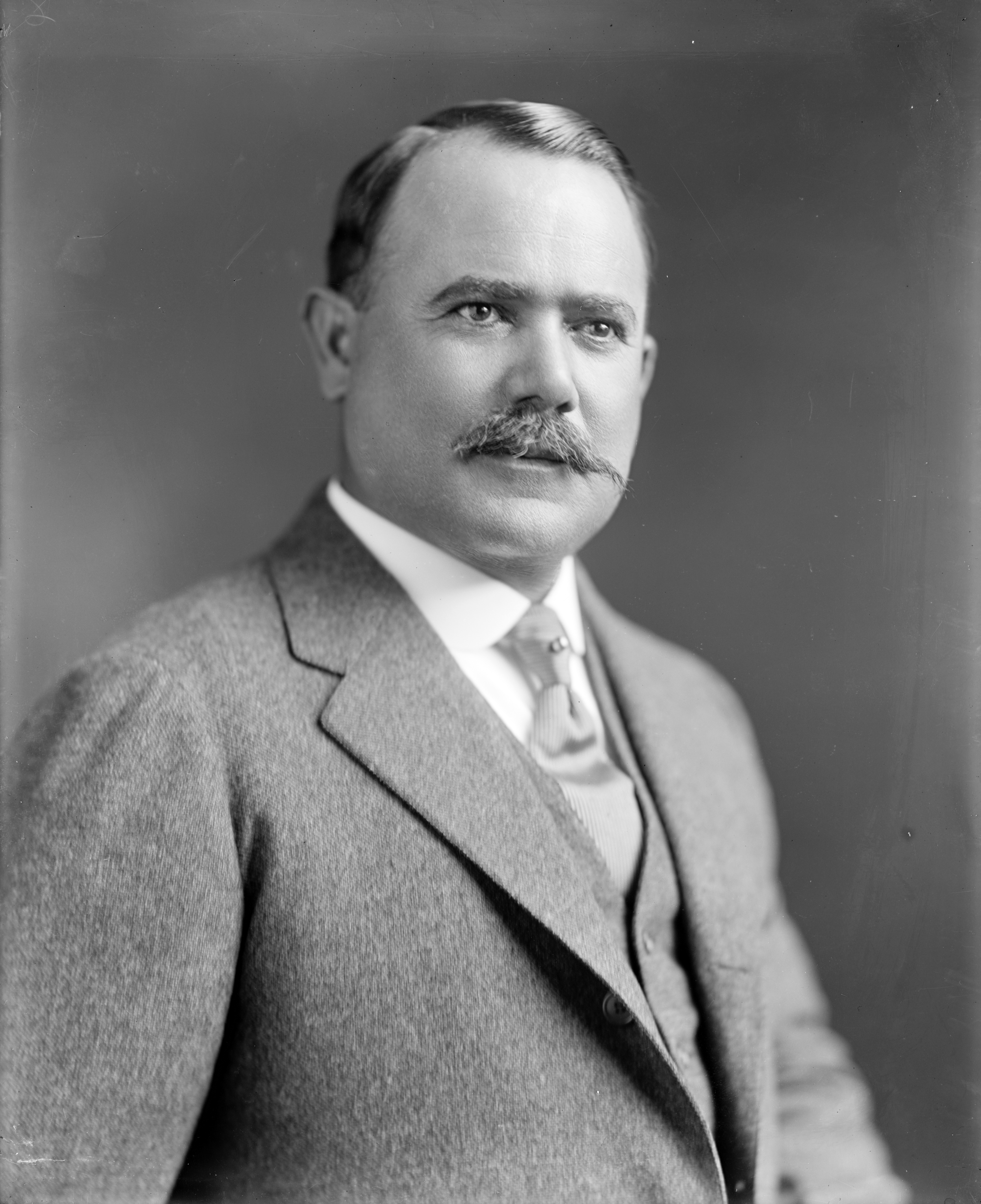
Revolutionary General and President of Mexico Álvaro Obregón (1920–1924)

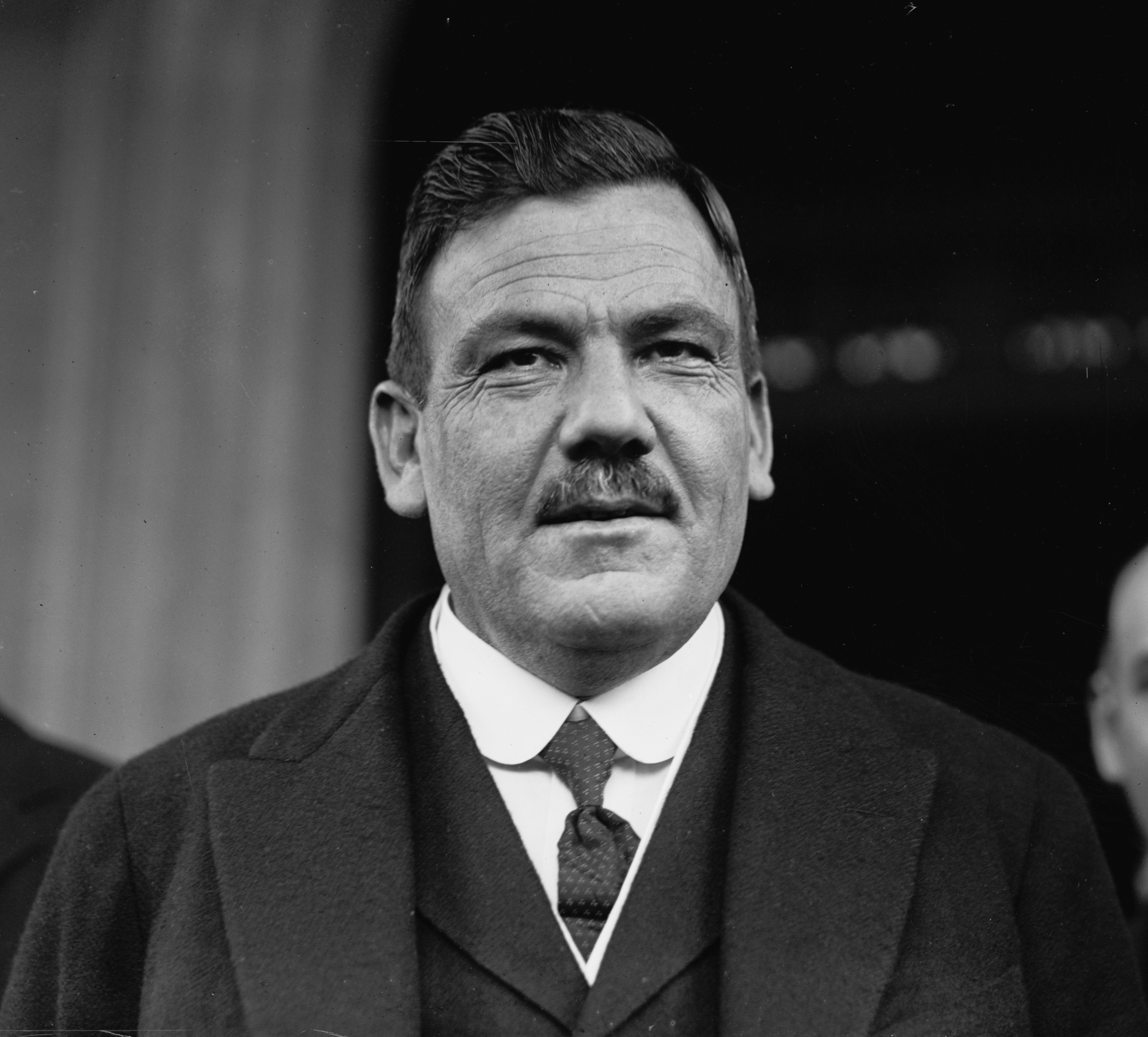
Revolutionary General and President of Mexico Plutarco Elías Calles (1924–1928)

There is no consensus when the Revolution ended, but the majority of scholars consider the 1920s and 1930s as being on the continuum of revolutionary change. The end date of revolutionary consolidation has also been set at 1946, with the last general serving as president and the political party morphing into the Institutional Revolutionary Party.

In 1920, Sonoran revolutionary general Álvaro Obregón was elected President of Mexico and inaugurated in December 1920, following the coup engineered by him and revolutionary generals Plutarco Elías Calles, and Adolfo de la Huerta. The coup was supported by other revolutionary generals against the civilian Carranza attempting to impose another civilian, Ignacio Bonillas as his successor. Obregón did not have to deal with two major revolutionary leaders. De la Huerta managed to persuade revolutionary general Pancho Villa to lay down his arms against the regime in return for a large estate in Durango, in northern Mexico. Carranza's agents had assassinated Emiliano Zapata in 1919, removing a consistent and effective opponent. Some counterrevolutionaries in Chiapas laid down their arms. The only pro-Carranza governor to resist the regime change was Esteban Cantú in Baja California, suppressed by northern revolutionary general Abelardo Rodríguez, later to become president of Mexico. Although the 1917 Constitution was not fully implemented and parts of the country were still controlled by local strongmen, caciques, Obregón's presidency did begin consolidation of parts of the revolutionary agenda, including expanded rights of labor and the peasantry.

Obregón was a pragmatist and not an ideologue, so that domestically he had to appeal to both the left and the right to ensure Mexico would not fall back into civil war. Securing labor rights built on Obregón's existing relationship with urban labor. The Constitutionists had made an alliance with labor during the revolution, mobilizing the Red Battalions against Zapata's and Villa's force. This alliance continued under Obregón's and Calles's terms as president. Obregón also focused on land reform. He had governors in various states push forward the reforms promised in the 1917 constitution. These were, however, quite limited. Former Zapatistas still had strong influence in the post-revolutionary government, so most of the reforms began in Morelos, the birthplace of the Zapatista movement.

Obregón's government was faced with the need for stabilizing Mexico after a decade of civil war. With the revolutionary armies having defeated the old federal army, Obregón now dealt with military leaders who were used to wielding power violently. Enticing them to leave the political arena in exchange for material rewards was one tactic. De la Huerta had already successfully used it with Pancho Villa. Not trusting Villa to remain on the sidelines, Obregón had him assassinated in 1923. In 1923 De la Huerta rebelled against Obregón and his choice of Calles as his successor as president, leading to a split in the military. The rebellion was suppressed and Obregón began to professionalize the military, reduced the number of troops by half, and forced officers to retire. Obregón (1920–24) followed by Calles (1924–28) viewed bringing the armed forces under state control as essential to stabilizing Mexico. Downsizing the military meant that state funds were freed up for other priorities, especially education. Obregón's Minister of Education, José Vasconcelos, initiated innovative broad educational and cultural programs.

Obregón sought diplomatic recognition by the U.S. in order to be considered legitimately holding power. He believed that once U.S. recognition was secured, other nations would follow suit. The U.S. and foreign interests were alarmed at provision in the new constitution powering the government to expropriate private property, and foreigners also had claims against Mexico for damage to their property during the decade of turmoil. American and British entrepreneurs had developed the petroleum industry in Mexico and had claims to oil still in the ground. Foreigners held extensive agricultural land that was now at risk to be distributed to landless Mexicans. Obregón and the U.S. entered in talks to sort out many issues, the Bucareli Treaty, concluded in 1923, with the U.S. recognizing Obregón's government. In Mexico the agreement was controversial, with it being perceived as making major concessions to the U.S. and undermining revolutionary goals, but Obregón pushed it through the legislature and gained American recognition. When his fellow Sonoran general De La Huerta rebelled later in 1923, the U.S. supplied Obregón with arms to put down the challenge.

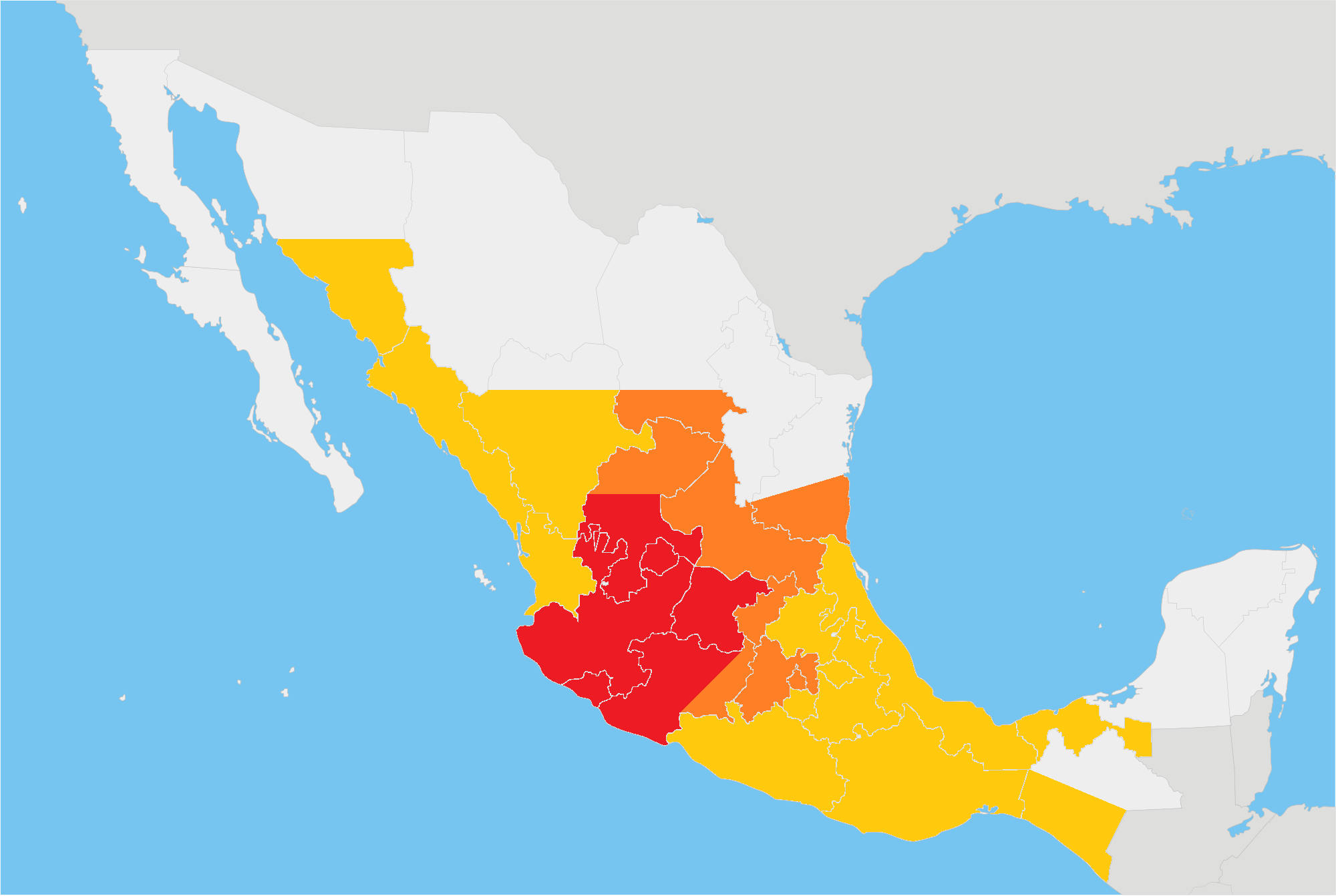
Conflict zones of the Cristero War. Map of Mexico showing regions in which Cristero outbreaks occurred Large-scale outbreaks Moderate outbreaks Sporadic outbreaks

In an attempt to buffer his regime against further coups, Calles began arming peasants and factory workers with surplus weapons. He continued other reforms pushed by his predecessor, but Calles was virulently anti-clerical and unlike Obregón who largely avoided direct conflict with the Catholic Church, Calles as president enforced the anticlerical provisions of the 1917 Constitution. Calles also put into effect a national school system that was largely secular to combat church influence in late 1924. After two years the state crackdown, the Catholic Church protested by going on its version of a strike, refusing to baptize, marry, give last rites, or give communion to parishioners. Many peasants also joined in opposition to the state's crackdown on religion, beginning the Cristero War, named for their clarion call Viva Cristo Rey ("long live Christ the king"). It was a lengthy, major uprising against the revolutionary vision of the Mexican state in central Mexico, not a short-lived, localized rebellion. Calles's stringent enforcement of anticlerical laws had an impact on the presidential succession, with Calles's comrade and chosen successor, ex-President and President-elect Obregón being assassinated by a religious fanatic in 1928, plunging the political system into a major crisis. By law Calles could not be re-elected, but a solution needed to be found to keep political power in the hands of the revolutionary elite and prevent the country from reverting to civil war.

==== Political crisis and the founding of the revolutionary party ====
Logo of the PNR

With the 1917 Constitution enshrining the principle of "no re-election", revolutionaries who had fought for the principle could not ignore it. Elections were when disgruntled aspirants to the presidency made their move, because it was a period of political transition. The Sonoran triumvirate had done so in 1920. In 1923, De la Huerta rebelled against Obregón's choice of Calles rather than himself as candidate. When Calles designated ex-president Obregón to succeed him, permitted by a constitutional amendment, the principle of no re-elected was technically adhered to, but there was the clear possibility of an endless alternation of the two powerful men. Other rebellions of revolutionary generals broke out in 1927, by Francisco Serrano and Arnulfo R. Gómez, which was suppressed, and the leaders executed. Obregón was elected, but assassinated before he took office, plunging the country into a political crisis over presidential succession. Since the Mexican Revolution had been sparked by the 1910 re-election of Díaz, Calles and others were well aware that the situation could spiral out of control. This political crisis came when the bloody Cristero War raged across central Mexico. A managed political solution to the crisis of presidential succession had to be found. The answer was the founding of the Partido Nacional Revolucionario. In 1929 Calles brought together the various factions, mainly regional strongmen. Calles himself could not become president again, but he remained a powerful figure, the Jefe Máximo, in a period called the Maximato (1928–34). Three men (Emilio Portes Gil, Pascual Ortiz Rubio, and Abelardo L. Rodríguez) held the presidency in what would have been Obregón's second term. To avoid alternation of the presidency by men who had previously held the office, the constitution was revised, reverted to the principle of no re-election.

An achievement in this period was the 1929 peace agreement between the Catholic Church and the Mexican state, brokered by Dwight Morrow, U.S. Ambassador to Mexico. The church-state conflict went into hibernation following the designation of General Manuel Ávila Camacho to succeed President Lázaro Cárdenas in 1940.

==== Revitalization under Lázaro Cárdenas: 1934–1940 ====
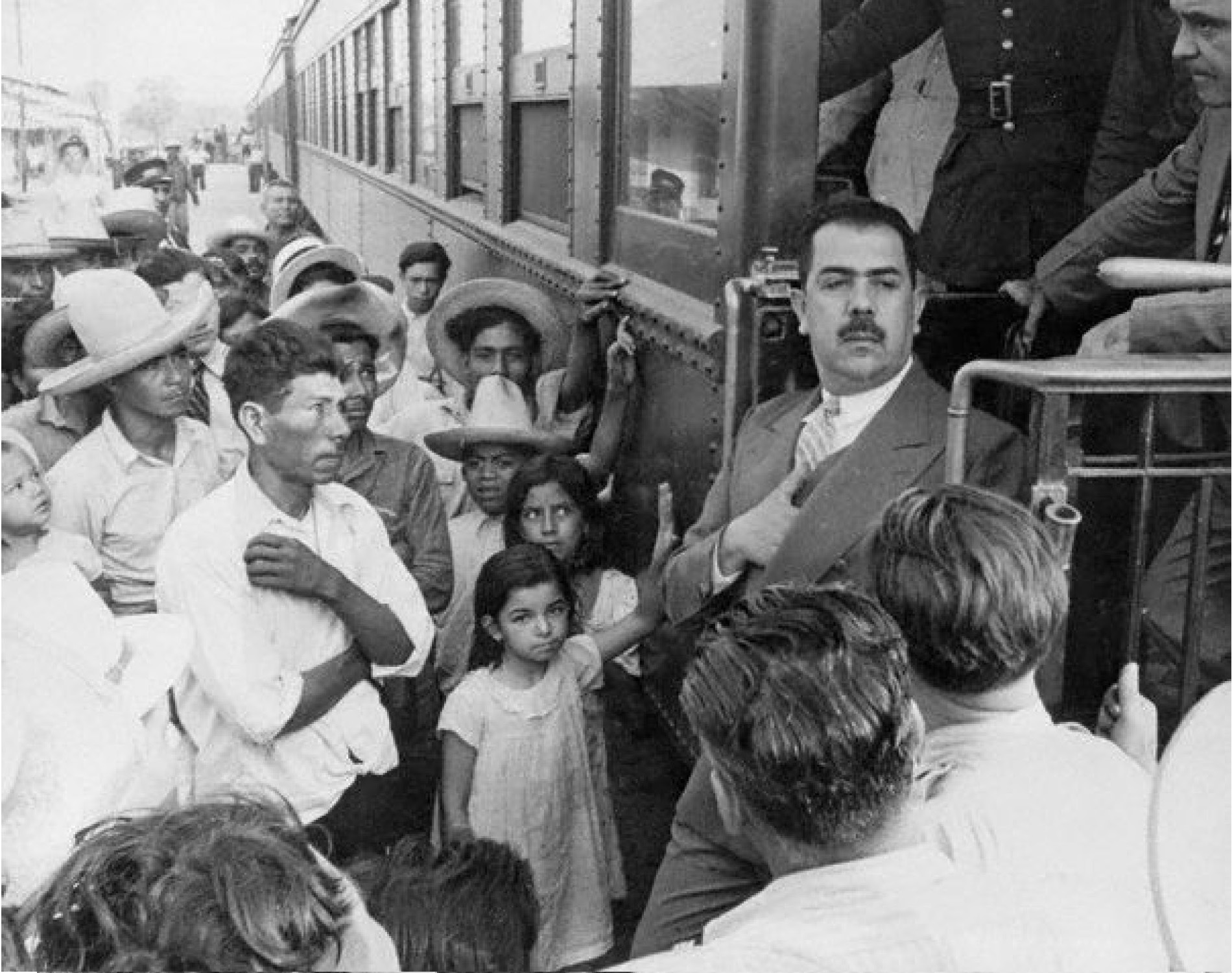
Revolutionary general and President Lázaro Cárdenas, pictured after nationalizing the railway system 1937

In 1934, Calles chose Lázaro Cárdenas as the PNR's presidential candidate. Unlike his three predecessors controlled by Calles, Cárdenas threw off the jefe máximo's power and set about implementing a re-vitalilzed revolutionary agenda. He vastly expanded agrarian reform, expropriated commercial landed estates; nationalized the railways and the petroleum industry; kept the peace with the Catholic Church as an institution; put down a major rebellion by Saturnino Cedillo; founded a new political party that created sectoral representation of industrial workers, peasants, urban office workers, and the army; engineered the succession of his hand-picked candidate; and then, perhaps the most radical act of all, stepped away from presidential power, letting his successor, General Manuel Ávila Camacho, exercise fully presidential power.

Cárdenas came from the southern state of Michoacan, but during the revolution had fought in the north, rising to the rank of general, and becoming a part of the northern dynasty. He returned to Michoacan after the revolution, and implemented a number of reforms that were precursors of those he enacted as president. With Calles's founding of the PNR, Cárdenas became part of the party apparatus. Calles had no idea that Cárdenas was as politically savvy as he turned out to be, managing to oust Calles from his role as the power behind the presidency and forcing him into exile. Calles had increasingly moved to the political right, abandoning support for land reform. Peasants who had joined the revolution with the hope that land reform would be enacted, and the constitution had empowered the state to expropriate land and other resources. During Cárdenas's presidency, he expropriated and distributed land and organized peasant leagues, incorporating them into the political system. Although in theory peasants and workers could come together as a single powerful sector, the PNR ruled that peasant organizations were to be separate from industrial labor, and organizing the countryside should be under the control of the party.

Cárdenas encouraged working class organizations and sought to bring them into the political system under state control. The CROM, an umbrella labor organization, had declined in power with the ouster of Calles. Radical labor leader Vicente Lombardo Toledano helped create the Confederation of Mexican Workers (CTM), a nationalist, autonomous, non-politically affiliated organization. Communists in the labor movement were aligned with the Moscow-controlled Communist International, and Cárdenas sought to strengthen the Mexican labor organization aligned with the Mexican revolutionary state.

His first acts of reform in 1935, were aimed towards peasants. Former strongmen within the land owning community were losing political power, so he began to side with the peasants more and more. He also tried to further centralize the government's power by removing regional caciques, allowing him to push reforms easier. To fill the political vacuum, Cárdenas helped the formation of PNR-sponsored peasant leagues, empowering both peasants and the government. Other reforms included nationalization of key industries such as petroleum and the railroads. To appease workers, Cárdenas furthered provisions to end debt peonage and company stores, which were largely eliminated under his rule, except in the most backwater areas of Mexico. To prevent conservative factions in the military from plotting and to put idle soldiers to work, Cárdenas mobilized the military to build public works projects. That same year another Cristero revolt occurred. This was partially caused by Cárdenas' mandate for secular education early in his presidency in 1934. The Cristeros were not supported by the Catholic hierarchy and Cárdenas quashed the revolt. The Catholic Church told rebels to surrender themselves to the government. In the next year, 1936, to further stabilize his rule, Cárdenas further armed the peasants and workers and begins to organize them into formal militias. This proved to be useful later in his presidency as the militias came to his aid in an attempted military coup in 1938. Seeing no opposition from the bourgeoisie, generals, or conservative landlords, in 1936 Cárdenas began building collective agricultural enterprises called ejidos to help give peasants access to land, mostly in southern Mexico. These appeased some agriculturalists, but many peasants would have preferred receiving individual plots of land to which they had title. The aim of ejidos was to replace the large-scale landed estates, many of which were foreign owned. Andrés Molina Enríquez, the intellectual father of article 27 of the constitution empowering the state to expropriate property, criticized the move, saying that the state itself was replacing private landowners, while the peasants remained tied to the land. Ejidos were not very good at feeding large populations, causing an urban food crisis. To alleviate this, Cárdenas co-opted the support of capitalists to build large commercial farms to feed the urban population. This put the final nail in the coffin of the feudal hacienda system, making Mexico a mixed economy, combining agrarian socialism and industrial capitalism by 1940.

Logo of the PRM, the new party created by Cárdenas

Cárdenas dissolved the revolutionary party founded by Calles, and established a new party, the Partido de la Revolución Mexicana, organized by sectors. There were four sectors: industrial workers, peasants, middle class workers, largely employed by the government, and the army. Bringing the military into the party structure was controversial, privately opposed by General Manuel Avila Camacho, who succeeded Cárdenas and in the final reformulation of the party, removed the military sector. Cárdenas calculated to manage the military politically and to remove it from independently intervening in politics and to keep it from becoming a separate caste. This new party organization was a resurrection of corporatism, essentially organization by estates or interest groups. The party was reorganized once again in 1946 as the Institutional Revolutionary Party, which kept sectoral representation but eliminated the military as a sector.

Cárdenas left office in 1940 at age 45. His departure marked the end of the social revolution and ushering in half a century of relative stability. However, in the assessment of historian Alan Knight, the 1940 election was "a requiem for Cardenismo: it revealed that hopes of a democratic succession were illusory; that electoral endorsement of the regime had to be manufactured; and that the Cardenista reforms, while creating certain loyal clienteles (some loyal from conviction, some by virtue of co-optation) had also raised up formidable opponents who now looked to take the offensive." He had a long and lustrous post-presidency, remaining influential in political life, and considered "the moral conscience of the Revolution". Cárdenas and his supporters carried "reforms further than any of their predecessors in Mexico or their counterparts in other Latin American countries."

== Characteristics ==
=== Violence in the Revolution ===
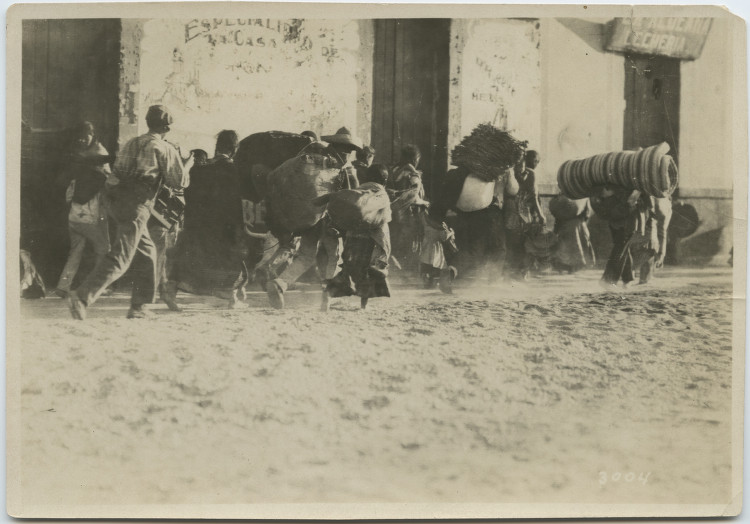
Civilians fleeing the danger zone in Mexico City February 16, 1913.

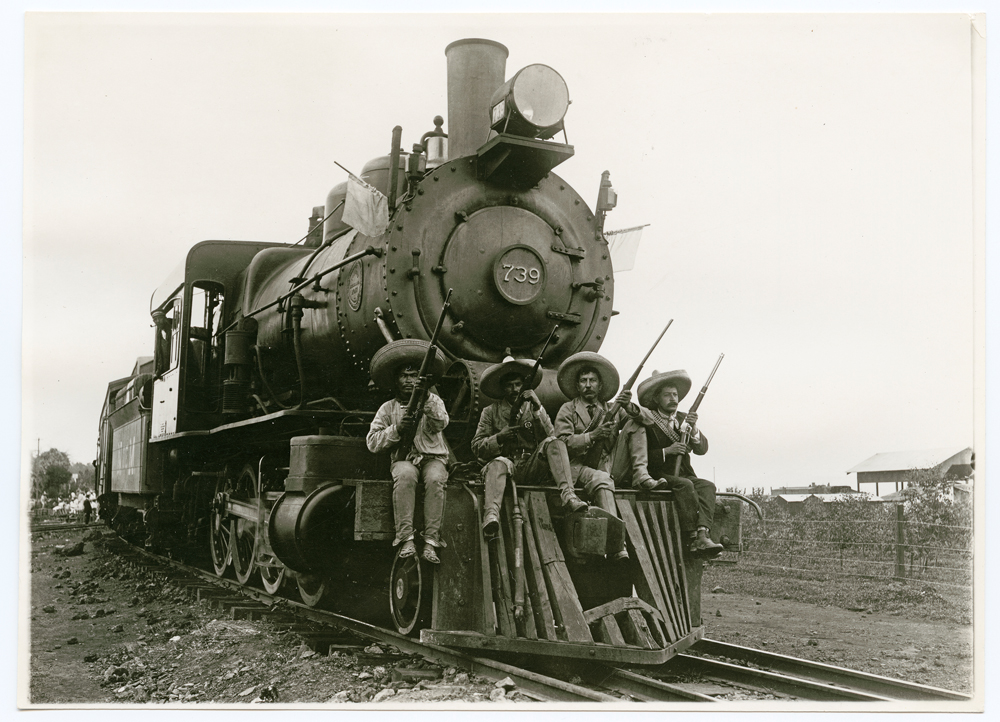
Revolutionaries seized trains. Photo by Hugo Brehme

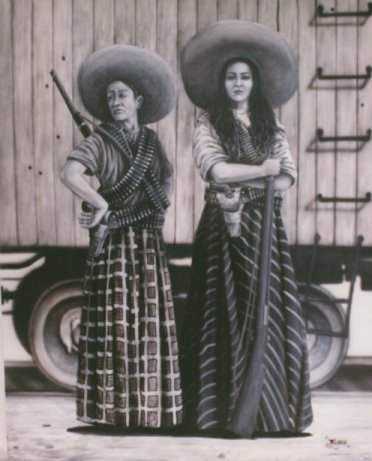
Soldaderas were participants in the Revolution, as combatants and support of combatants

The most obvious acts of violence which occurred during the Revolution involved soldiers participating in combat or summary executions. The actual fighting which occurred during the Maderista phase of the Revolution (1910–11) did not result in a large number of casualties, but during the Huerta era, the Federal Army summarily executed rebel soldiers, and the Constitutionalist Army executed Federal Army officers. There were no prisoner of war internment camps. Often rank-and-file soldiers of a losing faction were incorporated as troops by the ones who defeated them. The revolutionaries were not ideologically-driven, so they did not target their rivals for reprisals and they did not wage a "revolutionary terror" against them after they triumphed, in contrast to the French and Russian Revolutions. An exception to this pattern of behavior in the history of Mexico occurred in the aftermath of its nineteenth-century wars against Indigenous rebels.

The death toll of the combatants was not as large as it might have been, because the opposing armies rarely engaged in open-field combat. The revolutionaries initially operated as guerrilla bands, and they launched hit-and-run strikes against the enemy. They drew the Federal Army into combat on terms which were favorable to them, they did not engage in open battle nor did they attack heavily defended positions. They acquired weapons and ammunition which were abandoned by Federal forces and they also commandeered resources from landed estates and used them to feed their men. The Federal Army was unable to stray from the railway lines that transported them to contested areas, and they were unable to pursue the revolutionaries when they were attacked.

The death toll and the displacement of the population due to the Revolution is difficult to calculate. Mexico's population loss of 15 million was high, but numerical estimates vary greatly. Perhaps 1.5 million people died, and nearly 200,000 refugees fled abroad, especially to the United States. The violence caused by the Mexican Revolution resulted in Mexican immigration to the United States increasing five-fold from 1910 to 1920, with 100,000 Mexicans entering the United States by 1920, seeking better economic conditions, social stability, and political stability.

The violence which occurred during the Revolution did not just involve the largely male combatants, it also involved civilian populations of men, women, and children. Some ethnic groups were deliberately targeted, most particularly, the Chinese in northern Mexico. During the Maderista campaign in northern Mexico, there was anti-Chinese violence, particularly, the May 1911 massacre at Torreón, a major railway hub. In 1905, anti-Chinese sentiment was espoused in the Liberal Party Program of 1905.

Landed estates, many of which were owned by foreigners, were targeted for looting, the crops and animals were sold or they were used by the revolutionaries. The owners of some estates were killed. In the wake of the Revolution, a joint American-Mexican Claims Commission assessed the monetary damage and the amount of the monetary compensation which was due.

Cities were the prizes in revolutionary clashes, and many of them were severely damaged. A notable exception is Mexico City, which only sustained damage during the days leading up to the ouster and murder of Madero, when rebels shelled the central core of the capital, causing the death of many civilians and animals. The rebels launched the attack in an attempt to convince observers in Mexico and the world that Madero had completely lost control. The capital changed hands several times during the post-Huerta period. When the Conventionists held power, Villa and his men committed acts of violence against major supporters of Huerta and those who were considered revolutionary traitors with impunity. Villa's terror was not on the same scale as the reigns of terror which occurred during the French and Bolshevik Revolutions, but the assassinations and the kidnappings of wealthy people for ransom damaged Villa's reputation and they also caused the U.S. government's enthusiasm for him to cool.

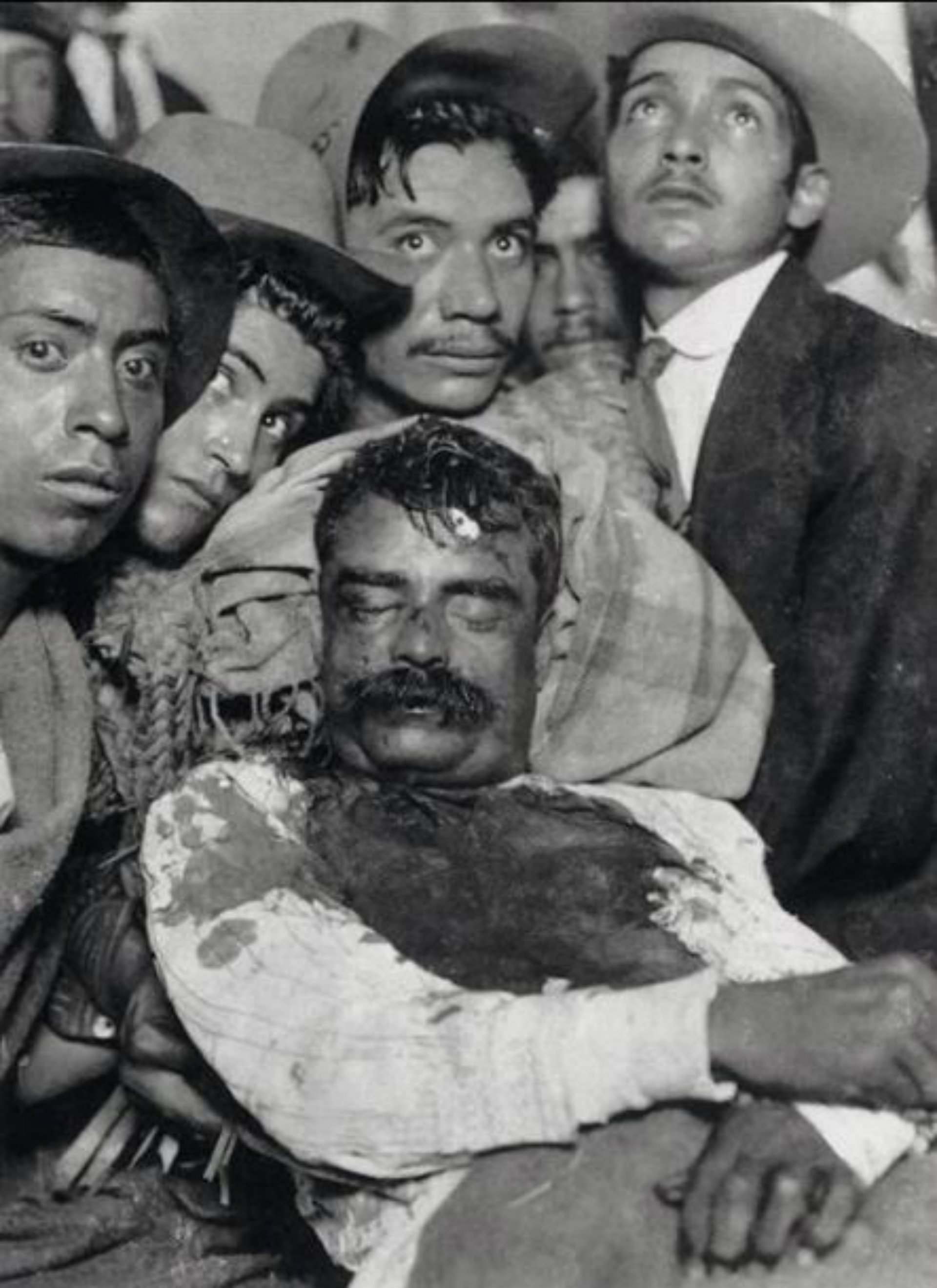
Photo of Zapata's corpse, Cuautla, 10 April 1919

Political assassination became a frequent way to eliminate rivals both during and after the Revolution. All of the major leaders of the Revolution were later assassinated: Madero in 1913, Zapata in 1919, Carranza in 1920, Villa in 1923, and Obregón in 1928. Porfirio Díaz, Victoriano Huerta, and Pascual Orozco had gone into exile. Believing that he would also go into exile, Madero turned himself into Huerta's custody. Huerta considered that too dangerous a course, since he could have been a rallying point. Huerta did not want to execute Madero publicly. The cover story of Madero and Pino Suárez being caught in the crossfire gave Huerta plausible deniability. He needed it, since he only had a thin veil of legitimacy in his ascention to the presidency. The bodies of Madero and Pino Suárez were not photographed nor were they displayed, but pictures of Madero's clothing were taken, showing bullet holes in the back. Zapata's death in 1919 was at the hands of Carranza's military. There was no need for a coverup since he had remained a threat to the Carranza regime. Photos of the dead Zapata were taken and published, as proof of his demise, but Carranza was tainted by the deed.

The economic damage which the revolution caused lasted for years. the Population losses which were due to military and civilian casualties, the displacement of populations which migrated to safer areas, and the damage to the infrastructure all had significant impacts. The nation would not regain the level of development which it reached in 1910 for another twenty years.

The railway lines which were constructed during the Porfiriato facilitated the movement of men, horses, and artillery and they were extensively used by all of the factions. This was much greater in northern Mexico, it was less so in the areas controlled by Zapata. When men and horses were transported by rail, the soldiers rode on the tops of boxcars. Railway lines, engines, and rolling stock were targeted for sabotage and the rebuilding of tracks and bridges was an ongoing issue. Major battles in the north were fought along railway lines or railway junctions, such as Torreón. Early on, northern revolutionaries also added hospital cars so the wounded could be treated. Horses remained important in troop movements, they were either directly ridden to combat zones or they were loaded on trains. Infantry also still played a role. Arms purchases, mainly from the United States, gave northern armies almost inexhaustible access to rifles and ammunition so long as they had the means to pay for them. New military technology, particularly machine guns, mechanized death on a large scale. El Paso, Texas became a major supplier of weaponry to the Constitutionalist Army.

=== Cultural aspects of the Mexican Revolution ===
There was considerable cultural production during the Revolution itself, including printmaking, music and photography, while in the post revolutionary era, revolutionary themes in painting and literature shaped historical memory and understanding of the Revolution.

==== Journalism and propaganda ====
Anti-Díaz publications before the outbreak of the Revolution helped galvanize opposition to him, and he cracked down with censorship. As President Madero believed in freedom of the press, which helped galvanize opposition to his own regime. The Constitutionalists had an active propaganda program, paying writers to draft appeals to opinion in the U.S. and to disparage the reputations of Villa and Zapata as reactionaries, bandits, and unenlightened peasants. El Paso, Texas just across from Ciudad Juárez was an important site for revolutionary journalism in English and Spanish. Mariano Azuela wrote Los de Abajo ("The Underdogs") in El Paso and published in serial form there. The alliance Carranza made with the Casa del Obrero Mundial helped fund that appealed to the urban working class, particularly in early 1915 before Obregón's victories over Villa and González's over Zapata. Once the armed opposition was less of a threat, Carranza dissolved Vanguardia as a publication.

Meanwhile, in the United States, Mexican-Americans created newspapers to help with the war effort, denouncing Diaz's regime as well as professing their support to the revolution. There were multiple newspapers written in the Spanish language, most notably, La Cronica, (The Chronicle in English) created by Nicasio Idar and his family in Laredo, Texas, a city which saw much action as a border town. La Cronica, as well as other Chicano newspapers, would mostly cover stories about the Mexican-American and Tejano communities in the border regions, as well as supporting the revolution. These articles were named fronterizo ("by the border" in English), a newspaper dedicated to describing life in the border regions which would write about Mexican-Americans and their long rooted history and culture pertaining to these lands, as people living by the international border would be called fronterizos (border-dwellers). These fronterizos would start out with two goals: to decry the racism and discrimination experienced by Mexicans and Mexicans-Americans in the United States, and to support the ongoing reforms in Mexico, equating the tyranny of Porfirio Díaz to that of white Texan politicians. A month after the start of the conflict, Idar from La Cronica argued that Mexican immigrants and American born Mexican-Americans should be inspired by the revolution's promise of land reform to fight for more civil rights in the United States. Fronterizos worked to produce a nationalistic perspective placing the borderlands as an integral part of Mexican culture, history, and as a crucial part to the revolution, as the borderlands and its communities have been ignored by both the United States and Mexican governments.

==== Prints and cartoons ====
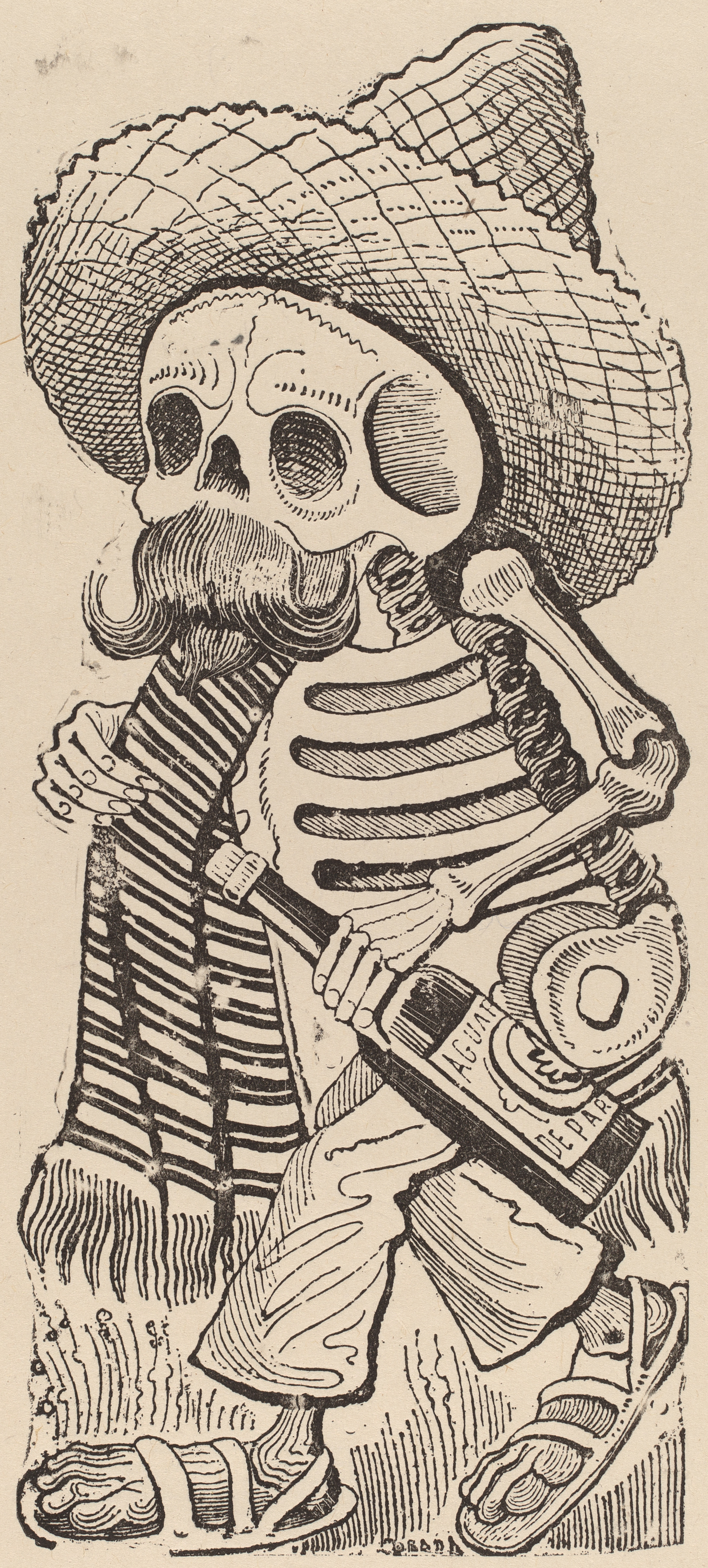
José Guadalupe Posada. The Calavera Maderista

During the late Porfiriato, political cartooning and print making developed as popular forms of art. The most well known print maker of that period is José Guadalupe Posada, whose satirical prints, particularly featuring skeletons, circulated widely. Posada died in early 1913, so his caricatures are only of the early revolution. One published in El Vale Panchito entitled "oratory and music" shows Madero atop a pile of papers and the Plan of San Luis Potosí, haranguing a dark-skinned Mexican whose large sombrero has the label pueblo (people). Madero is in a dapper suit. The caption reads "offerings to the people to rise to the presidency." Political cartoons by Mexicans as well as Americans caricatured the situation in Mexico for a mass readership. Political broadsides including songs of the revolutionary period were also a popular form of visual art. After 1920, Mexican muralism and printmaking were two major forms of revolutionary art. Prints were easily reproducible and circulated widely, while murals commissioned by the Mexican government necessitated a journey to view them. Printmaking "emerged as a favored medium, alongside government sponsored mural painting among artists ready to do battle for a new aesthetic as well as a new political order." Diego Rivera, better known for his painting than printmaking, reproduced his depiction of Zapata in the murals in the Cortés Palace in Cuernavaca in a 1932 print.

==== Photography, motion pictures, and propaganda ====
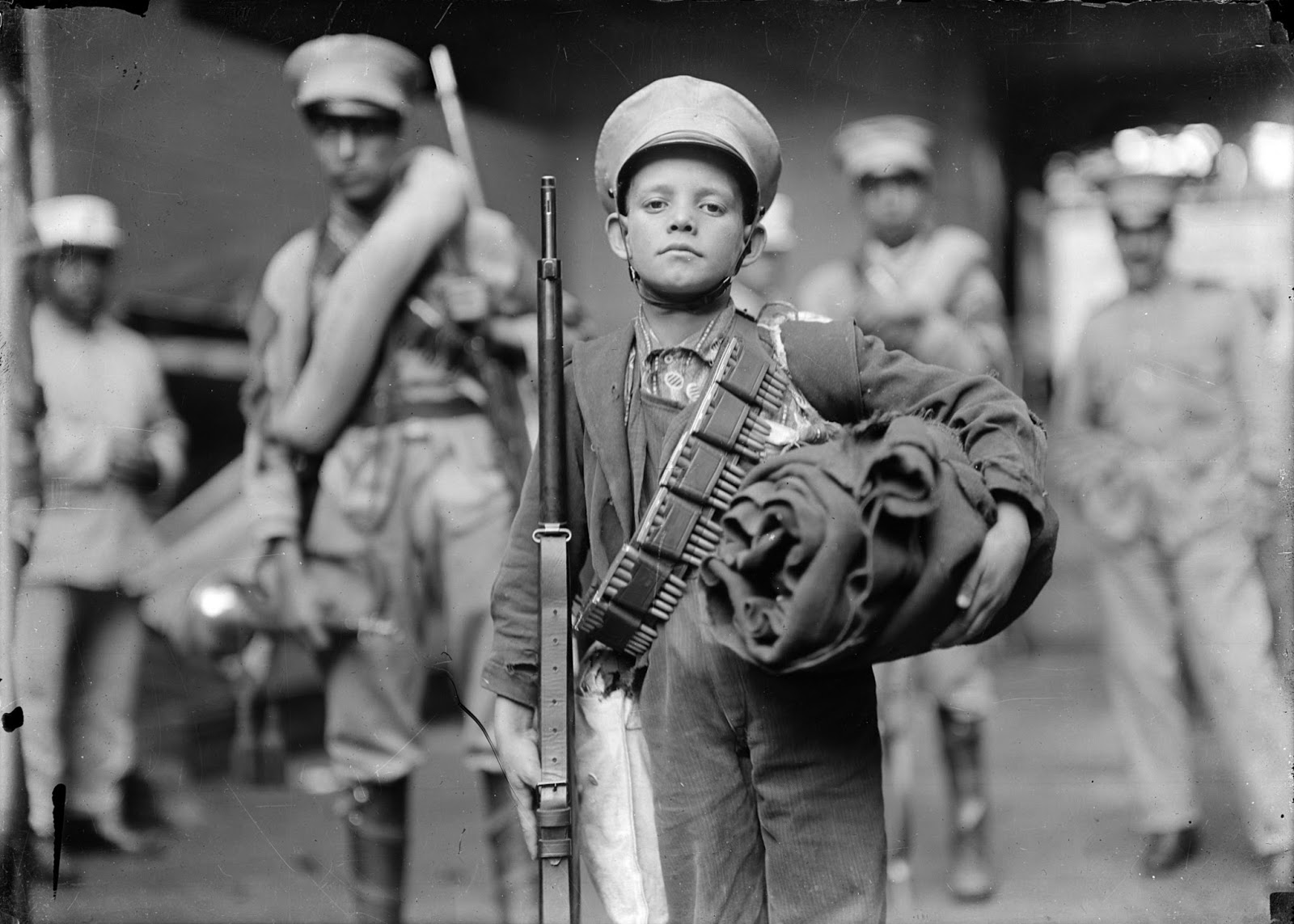
Child soldier

The Mexican Revolution was extensively photographed as well as filmed, so that there is a large, contemporaneous visual record. "The Mexican Revolution and photography were intertwined." There was a large foreign viewership for still and moving images of the Revolution. The photographic record is by no means complete since much of the violence took place in relatively remote places, but it was a media event covered by photographers, photojournalists, and professional cinematographers. Those behind the lens were hampered by the large, heavy cameras that impeded capturing action images, but no longer was written text enough, with photographs illustrating and verifying the written word.

The revolution "depended heavily, from its inception, on visual representations and, in particular, on photographs." The large number of Mexican and foreign photographers followed the action and stoked public interest in it. Among the foreign photographers were Jimmy Hare, Otis A. Aultman, Homer Scott, and Walter Horne. Images appeared in newspapers and magazines, as well as postcards. Horne was associated with the Mexican War Postcard Company.

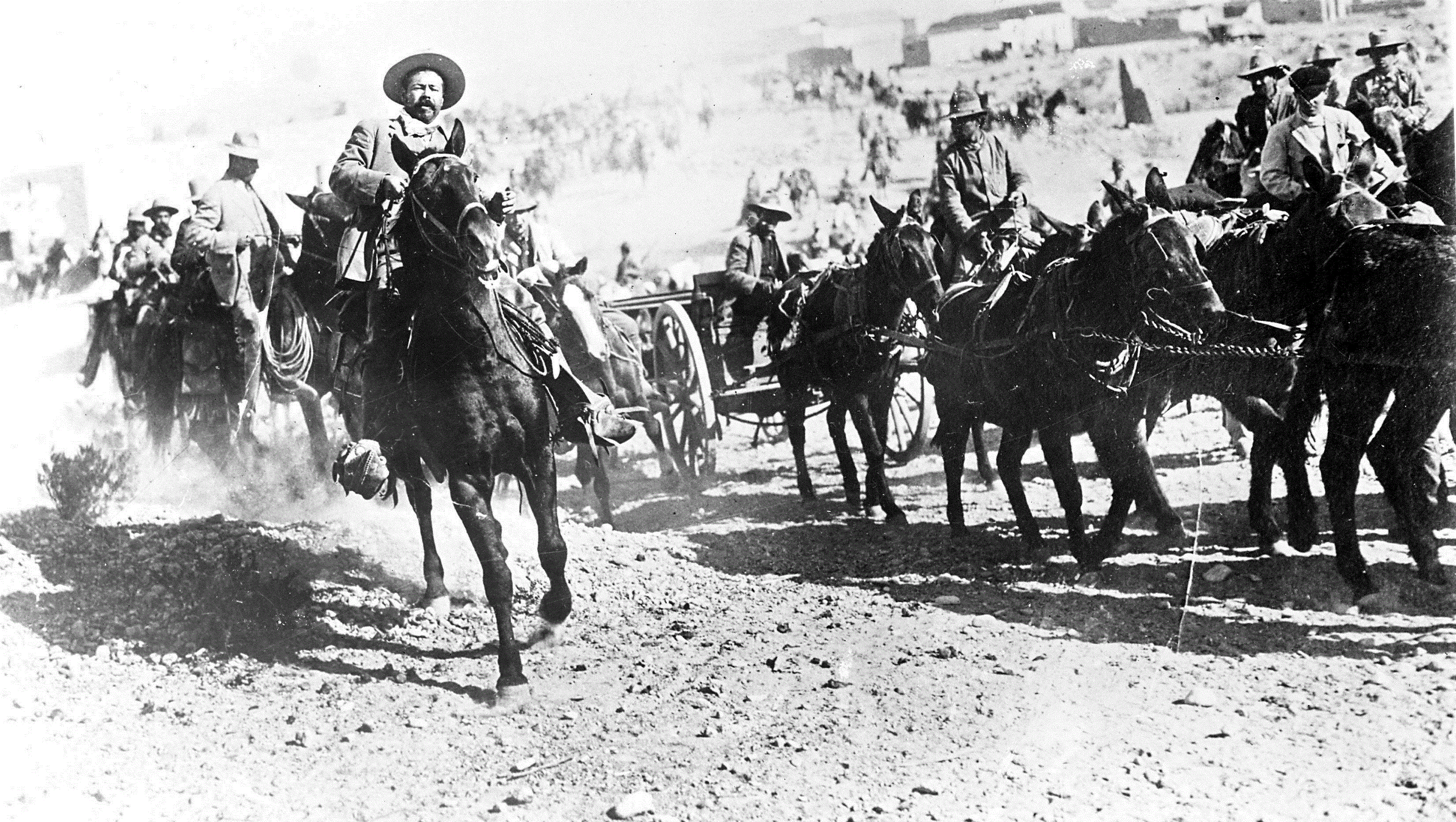
Iconic image of Villa in Ojinaga, a publicity still taken by Mutual Film Corporation photographer John Davidson Wheelan in January 1914

Most prominent of the documentary film makers were Salvador Toscano and Jesús H. Abitía, and some 80 cameramen from the U.S. filmed as freelancers or employed by film companies. The footage has been edited and reconstructed into documentary films, Memories of a Mexican (Carmen Toscano de Moreno 1950) and Epics of the Mexican Revolution (Gustavo Carrera). Principal leaders of the Revolution were well aware of the propaganda element of documentary film making, and Pancho Villa contracted with an American film company to record for viewers in the U.S. his leadership on the battlefield. The film has been lost, but the story of the film making was interpreted in the HBO scripted film And Starring Pancho Villa as Himself. The largest collection of still photographs of the Revolution is the Casasola Archive, named for photographer Agustín Casasola (1874–1938), with nearly 500,000 images held by the Fototeca Nacional in Pachuca. A multivolume history of the Revolution, Historia Gráfica de la Revolución Mexicana, 1900–1960 contains hundreds of images from the era, along with explanatory text.

==== Painting ====
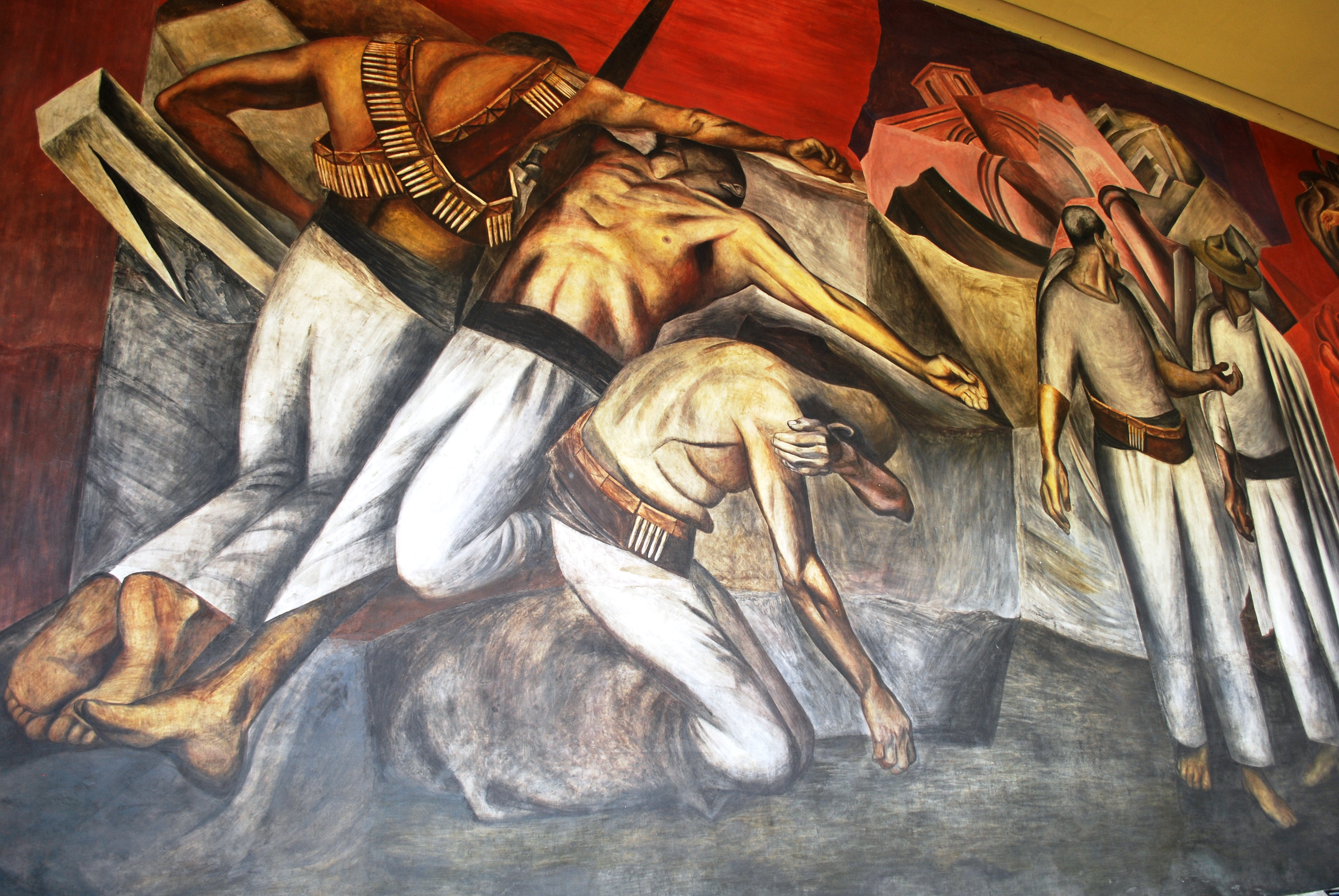
José Clemente Orozco, The Trench, mural in the San Ildefonso College, Mexico City

Venustiano Carranza attracted artists and intellectuals to the Constitutionalist cause. Painter, sculptor and essayist Gerardo Murillo, known as Dr. Atl, was ardently involved in art production in the cause of the revolution. He was involved with the anarcho-syndicalist labor organization, the Casa del Obrero Mundial and in met and encouraged José Clemente Orozco and David Alfaro Siqueiros in producing political art. The government of Álvaro Obregón (1920–24) and his Minister of Education, José Vasconcelos commissioned artists to decorate government buildings of the colonial era with murals depicting Mexico's history. Many of these focused on aspects of the Revolution. The "Big Three" of Mexican muralism, Diego Rivera, Orozco, and Siqueiros produced narratives of the Revolution, shaping historical memory and interpretation.

==== Music ====
Soy zapatista del Edo. de Morelos ("I'm a Zapatista from the State of Morelos"), a southern corrido written by the revolutionary Marciano Silva.

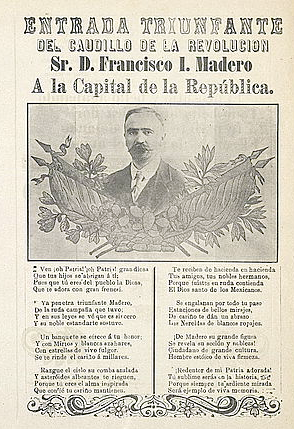
Corrido sheet music celebrating the entry of Francisco I. Madero into Mexico City in 1911.

A number of traditional Mexican songs or corridos were written at the time, serving as a kind of news report and functioned as propaganda, memorializing aspects of the Mexican Revolution. The term Adelitas an alternative word for soldaderas, is from a corrido titled "La Adelita". The song "La Cucaracha", with numerous verses, was popular at the time of the Revolution, and subsequently, and is too in the present day. Published corridos often had images of particular revolutionary heroes along with the verses.

==== Literature ====
Few novels of the Mexican Revolution were written at the time: Mariano Azuela's Los de Abajo (translated as The Underdogs) is a notable one, originally published in serial form in newspapers. Literature is a lens through which to see the Revolution. Nellie Campobello is one of the few women writers of the Revolution; her Cartucho (1931) is an account of the Revolution in northern Mexico, emphasizing the role of Villistas, when official discourse was erasing Villa's memory and emphasizing nationalist and centralized ideas of the Revolution. Martín Luis Guzmán's El águila y el serpiente (1928) and La sombra del caudillo(1929) drew on his experiences in the Constitutionalist Army. In the fiction of Carlos Fuentes, particularly The Death of Artemio Cruz, the Revolution and its perceived betrayal are key factors in driving the narrative.

==== Gender ====
The revolution that occurred during 1910 greatly affected gender roles present in Mexico. However, it continued to create a strict separation between genders although both men and women were involved in the revolution. Women were involved by promoting political reform as well as enlisting in the military. Women who were involved in political reform would create reports that outlined the changes people wanted to see in their area. That type of activism was seen inside and outside of the cities. Women not only took political action but also enlisted in the military and became teachers to contribute to the change that they wanted to see after the revolution. Women were seen as prizes by many men involved in the military. Being involved in the military gave men a greater sense of superiority over women, which gave women the connotation of being a prize. That idea often lead to violence against women, which meanwhile increased. After the revolution, the ideas women contributed to the revolution were put on hold for many years. Women would often promote the ideas of establishing a greater justice system and creating ideals surrounded by democracy. The revolution caused many people to further reinstate the idea that women were meant to be taking care of the household. Women were also put in the lower part of the social class because of this idea.

==== Female soldiers during the revolution ====
Women who had been discarded by their families would often join the military. Being involved in the military would lead to scrutiny amongst some male participants. In order to avoid sexual abuse many women would make themselves appear more masculine. They would also dress more masculine in order to gain more experience with handling weapons, and learning more about military jobs.

===== María de Jesús González =====
An example of this is presented by María de Jesús González who was a secret agent involved in Carranza's army. She would often present herself as a man in order to complete certain tasks assigned to her. After she completed these tasks she would return to her feminine appearance.

===== Rosa Bobadilla =====
Rosa Bodilla, however, maintained her feminine appearance throughout her military career. She joined the Zapata's military with her husband. When he died, she was given his title, which became "Colonel Rosa Bobadila widow of Casas." She gave orders to men while continuing to dress as a woman.

===== Amelio Robles =====
After the revolution, Amelio Robles continued to look like and identify as a male for the rest of his life. Robles abandoned his home in order to join the Zapata military. Throughout the war, Robles began to assume a more masculine identity. After the war, he did not return to his former appearance like other females had. Robles carried on with his life as Amelio, and remained to look as well as act masculine. He reestablished himself into the community as a male, and was recognized as a male on his military documents.

== Interpreting the history of the revolution ==
There is a vast historiography on the Mexican Revolution, with many different interpretations of the history. Over time it has become more fragmented. There is consensus as to when the revolution began, that is in 1910, but there is no consensus when it ended. The Constitutionalists defeated their major rivals and called the constitutional convention that drafted the 1917 Constitution, but did not effectively control all regions. The year 1920 was the last successful military rebellion, bringing the northern revolutionary generals to power. According to Álvaro Matute, "By the time Obregón was sworn in as president on December 1, 1920, the armed stage of the Mexican Revolution was effectively over." The year 1940 saw revolutionary general and President Lázaro Cárdenas choose Manuel Avila Camacho, a moderate, to succeed him. A 1966 anthology by scholars of the revolution was entitled Is the Mexican Revolution Dead?. Historian Alan Knight has identified "orthodox" interpretation of the revolution as a monolithic, popular, nationalist revolution, while revisionism has focused on regional differences, and challenges its credentials revolution. One scholar classifies the conflict as a "great rebellion" rather than a revolution.

Major leaders of the Revolution have been the subject of biographies, including the martyred Francisco I. Madero. There are many biographies of Zapata and Villa, whose movements did not achieve power, along with studies of the presidential career of revolutionary general Lázaro Cárdenas. In recent years, biographies of the victorious northerners Carranza, Obregón, and Calles have reassessed their roles in the Revolution. Sonorans in the Mexican Revolution have not yet collectively been the subject of a major study.

Often studied as an event solely of Mexican history, or one also involving Mexico's northern neighbor, scholars now recognize that "From the beginning to the end, foreign activities figured crucially in the Revolution's course, not simple antagonism from the U.S. government, but complicated Euro-American imperialist rivalries, extremely intricate during the first world war." A key work illuminating the international aspects of the Revolution is Friedrich Katz's 1981 work The Secret War in Mexico: Europe, the United States, and the Mexican Revolution.

== Historical memory ==
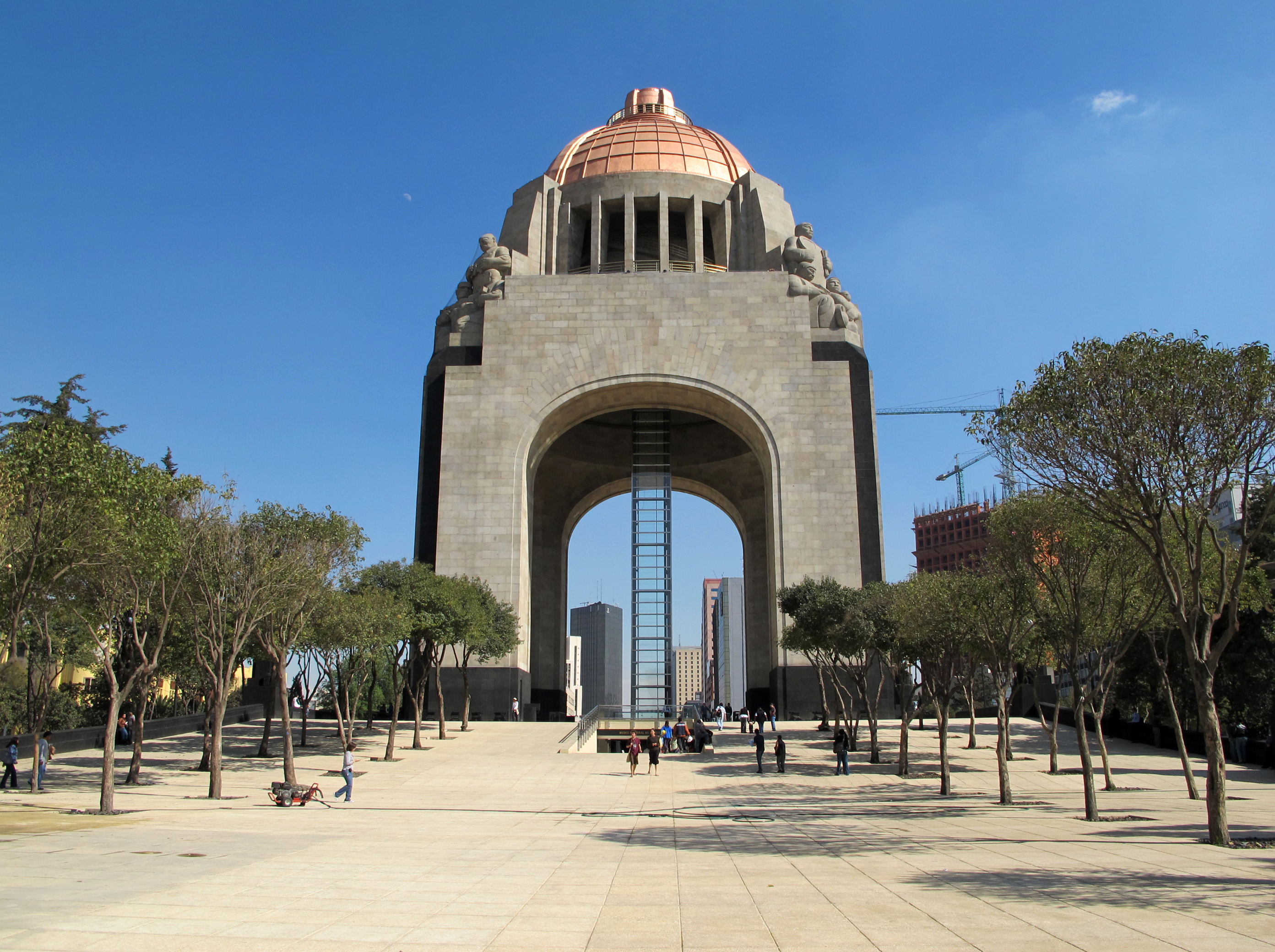
The Monument to the Revolution in Mexico City. It was to be the new legislative palace of the Díaz regime, but construction was interrupted by the revolution

In 2010, the Centennial of the Revolution and the Bicentennial of Independence was an occasion to take account of Mexico's history. The centennial of independence in 1910 had been the swan song of the Porfiriato. With President Felipe Calderón (2006–2012) of the conservative National Action Party, there was considerable emphasis on the bicentennial of independence rather than on the Mexican Revolution.

=== Heroes and villains ===
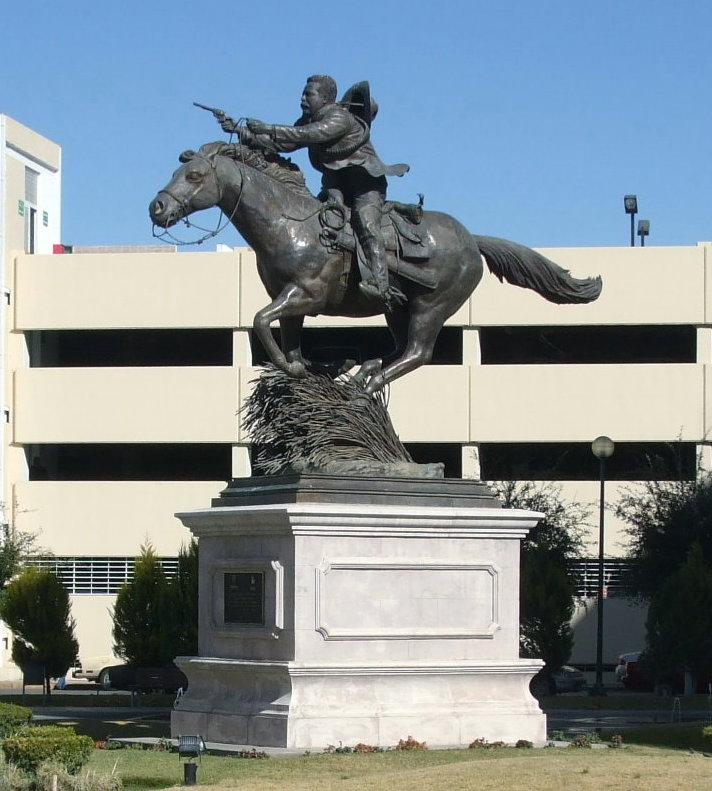
Equestrian bronze of Villa in Chihuahua, Chihuahua

The popular heroes of the Mexican Revolution are the two radicals who lost: Emiliano Zapata and Pancho Villa. As early as 1921, the Mexican government began appropriating the memory and legacy of Zapata for its own purposes. Pancho Villa fought against those who won the Revolution and he was excluded from the revolutionary pantheon for a considerable time, but his memory and legend remained alive among the Mexican people. The government recognized his continued potency and had his remains reburied in the Monument of the Revolution after considerable controversy.

With the exception of Zapata who rebelled against him in 1911, Francisco Madero was revered as "the apostle of democracy". Madero's murder in the 1913 counterrevolutionary coup elevated him as a "martyr" of the Revolution, whose memory unified the Constitutionalist coalition against Huerta. Venustiano Carranza gained considerable legitimacy as a civilian leader of the Constitutionalists, having supported Madero in life and led the successful coalition that ousted Huerta. Then Carranza downplayed Madero's role in the revolution in order to substitute himself as the origin of the true revolution. Carranza owned "the bullets taken from the body of Francisco I. Madero after his murder. Carranza had kept them in his home, perhaps because they were a symbol of a fate and a passive denouement he had always hoped to avoid."

Huerta remains the enduring villain of the Mexican Revolution for his coup against Madero. Díaz is still popularly and officially reviled, although there was an attempt to rehabilitate his reputation in the 1990s by President Carlos Salinas de Gortari, who was implementing the North American Free Trade Agreement and amending the constitution to eliminate further land reform. Pascual Orozco, who with Villa captured Ciudad Juárez in May 1911, continues to have an ambiguous status, since he led a major rebellion against Madero in 1912 and then threw his lot in with Huerta. Orozco much more than Madero was considered a manly man of action.

=== Monuments ===
The most permanent manifestations of history are in the built landscape, especially the Monument to the Revolution in Mexico City and statues and monuments to particular leaders. The Monument to the Revolution was created from the partially built Palacio Legislativo, a major project of Díaz's government. The construction was abandoned with the outbreak of the Revolution in 1910. In 1933, during the Maximato of Plutarco Elías Calles, the shell was re-purposed to commemorate the Revolution. Buried in the four pillars are the remains of Francisco I. Madero, Venustiano Carranza, Plutarco Elías Calles, Lázaro Cárdenas, and Francisco [Pancho] Villa. In life, Villa fought Carranza and Calles, but his remains were transferred to the monument in 1979 during the administration of President José López Portillo. Prior to the construction of that monument, one was built in 1935 to the amputated arm of General Álvaro Obregón, lost in victorious battle against Villa in the 1915 Battle of Celaya. The monument is on the site of the restaurant La Bombilla, where he was assassinated in 1928. The arm was cremated in 1989, but the monument remains.

=== Naming ===
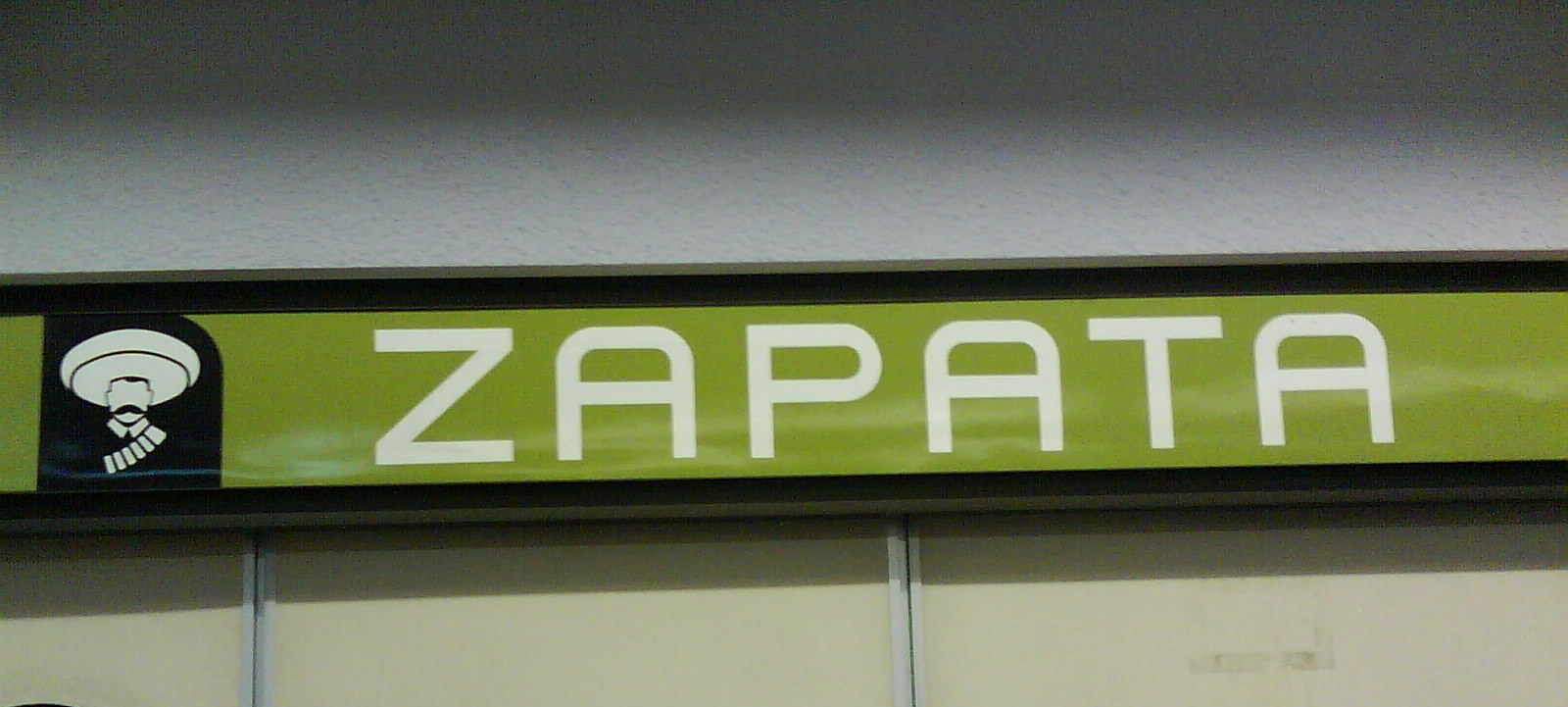
Metro Zapata in Mexico City, the icon shows a stylized, eyeless Zapata

Names are a standard way governments commemorate people and events. Many towns and cities of Mexico recall the revolution. In Mexico City, there are delegaciones (boroughs) named for Álvaro Obregón, Venustiano Carranza, and Gustavo A. Madero, brother of murdered president. There is a portion of the old colonial street Calle de los Plateros leading to the main square zócalo of the capital named Francisco I. Madero.

The Mexico City Metro has stations commemorating aspects of the Revolution and the revolutionary era. When it opened in 1969, with line 1 (the "Pink Line"), two stations alluded to the revolution. Most directly referencing the Revolution was Metro Pino Suárez, named after Francisco I. Madero's vice president, who was murdered with him in February 1913. There is no Metro stop named for Madero. The other was Metro Balderas, whose icon is a cannon, alluding to the Ciudadela armory where the coup against Madero was launched. In 1970, Metro Revolución opened, with the station at the Monument to the Revolution. As the Metro expanded, further stations with names from the revolutionary era opened. In 1980, two popular heroes of the Revolution were honored, with Metro Zapata explicitly commemorating the peasant revolutionary from Morelos. A sideways commemoration was Metro División del Norte, named after the Army that Pancho Villa commanded until its demise in the Battle of Celaya in 1915. The year 1997 saw the opening of the Metro Lázaro Cárdenas station. In 1988, Metro Aquiles Serdán honors the first martyr of the Revolution Aquiles Serdán. In 1994, Metro Constitución de 1917 opened, as did Metro Garibaldi, named after the grandson of Italian fighter for independence, Giuseppi Garibaldi. The grandson had been a participant in the Mexican Revolution. In 1999, the radical anarchist Ricardo Flores Magón was honored with the Metro Ricardo Flores Magón station. Also opening in 1999 was Metro Romero Rubio, named after the leader of Porfirio Díaz's Científicos, whose daughter Carmen Romero Rubio became Díaz's second wife. In 2012, a new Metro line opened with a Metro Hospital 20 de Noviembre stop, a hospital named after the date that Madero set in 1910 for rebellion against Díaz. There are no Metro stops named for revolutionary generals and presidents of Mexico, Carranza, Obregón, or Calles, and only an oblique reference to Villa in Metro División del Norte.

=== Role of women ===
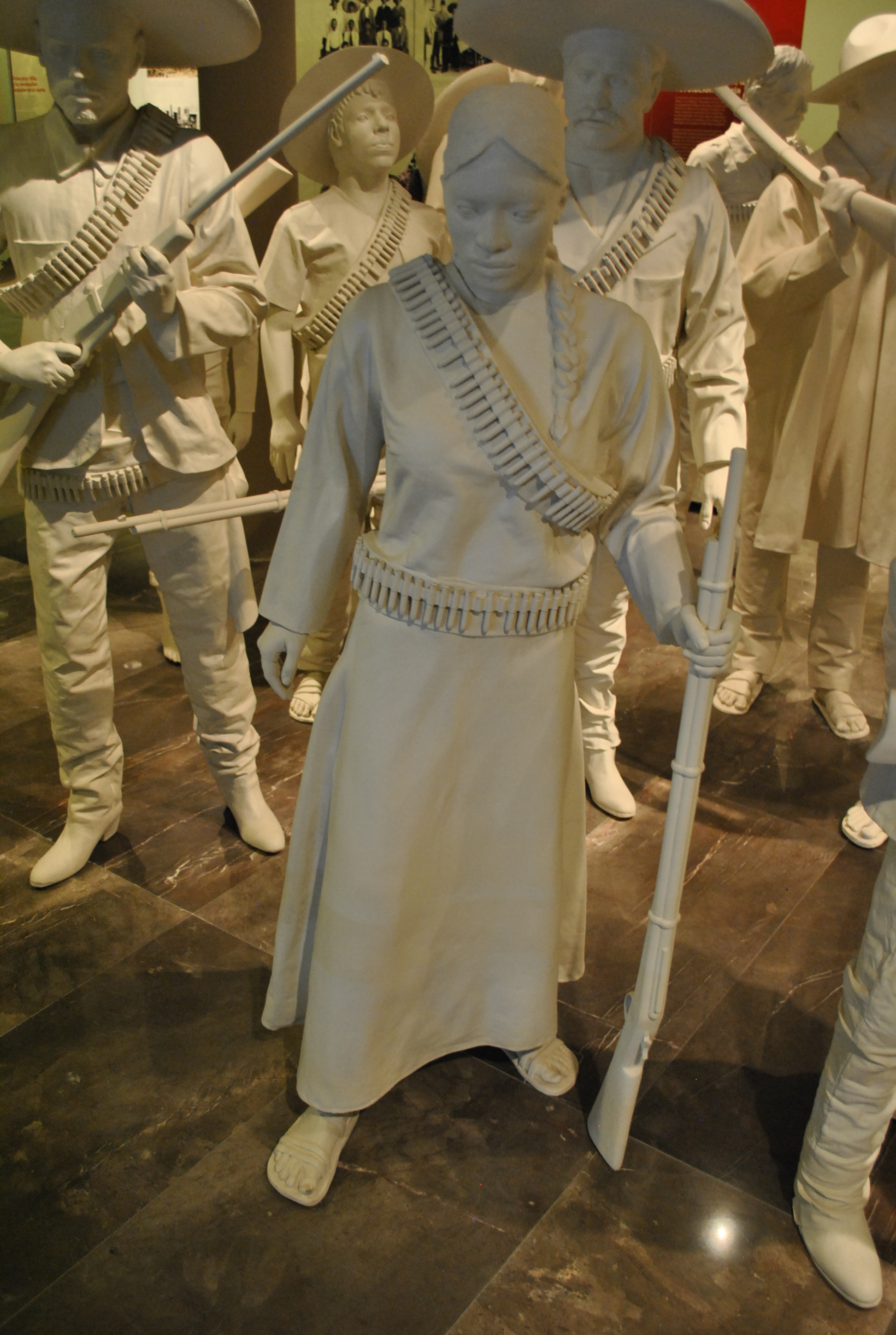
Adelita in the Historical Museum of the Mexican Revolution

The role of women in the Mexican Revolution has not been an important aspect of official historical memory, although the situation is changing. Carranza pushed for the rights of women, and gained women's support. During his presidency he relied on his personal secretary and close aide, Hermila Galindo de Topete, to rally and secure support for him. Through her efforts he was able to gain the support of women, workers and peasants. Carranza rewarded her efforts by lobbying for women's equality. He helped change and reform the legal status of women in Mexico. In the Historical Museum of the Mexican Revolution, there is a recreation of Adelita, the idealized female revolutionary combatant or soldadera. The typical image of a soldadera is of a woman with braids, wearing female attire, with ammunition belts across her chest. There were a few revolutionary women, known as coronelas, who commanded troops, some of whom dressed and identified as male; they do not fit the stereotypical image of soldadera and are not celebrated in historical memory at present.

== Legacies ==
=== Strong central government, civilian subordination of military ===
Although the ignominious end of Venustiano Carranza's presidency in 1920 cast a shadow over his legacy in the Revolution, sometimes viewed as a conservative revolutionary, he and his northern allies laid "the foundation of a more ambitious, centralizing state dedicated to national integration and national self-assertion." In the assessment of historian Alan Knight, "a victory of Villa and Zapata would probably have resulted in a weak, fragmented state, a collage of revolutionary fiefs of varied political hues presided over by a feeble central government." Porfirio Díaz had successfully centralized power during his long presidency. Carranza was an old politico of the Díaz regime, considered a kind of bridge between the old Porfirian order and the new revolutionary. The northern generals seized power in 1920, with the "Sonoran hegemony prov[ing] complete and long lasting." The Sonorans, particularly Álvaro Obregón, were battle-tested leaders and pragmatic politicians able to consolidate centralized power immediately after 1920. The revolutionary struggle destroyed the professional army and brought to power men who joined the Revolution as citizen-soldiers. Once in power, successive revolutionary generals holding the presidency, Obregón, Calles, and Cárdenas, systematically downsized the army and instituted reforms to create a professionalized force subordinate to civilian politicians. By 1940, the government had controlled the power of the revolutionary generals, making the Mexican military subordinate to the strong central government, breaking the cycle of military intervention in politics dating to the independence era. It is also in contrast to the pattern of military power in many Latin American countries.

=== Constitution of 1917 ===
An important element of the revolution's legacy is the 1917 Constitution. The document brought numerous reforms demanded by populist factions of the revolution, with article 27 empowering the state to expropriate resources deemed vital to the nation. These powers included expropriation of hacienda lands and redistribution to peasants. Article 27 also empowered the government to expropriate holdings of foreign companies, most prominently seen in the 1938 expropriation of oil. In Article 123 the constitution codified major labor reforms, including an 8-hour workday, a right to strike, equal pay laws for women, and an end to exploitative practices such as child labor and company stores. The constitution strengthened restrictions on the Catholic Church in Mexico, which when enforced by the Calles government, resulted in the Cristero War and a negotiated settlement of the conflict. The restrictions on the religion in the Constitution remained in place until the early 1990s. The Salinas government introduced reforms to the constitution that rolled back the government's power to expropriate property and its restrictions on religious institutions, as part of his policy to join the U.S. and Canada Free Trade Agreement. Just as the government of Carlos Salinas de Gortari was amending significant provisions of the constitution, Metro Constitución de 1917 station was opened.

=== Institutional Revolutionary Party ===
Logo of the Institutional Revolutionary Party, which incorporates the colors of the Mexican flag

The creation of the Institutional Revolutionary Party (PRI) emerged as a way to manage political power and succession without resorting to violence. It was established in 1929 by President Calles, in the wake of the assassination of President-elect Obregón and two rebellions by disgruntled revolutionary generals with presidential ambitions. Initially, Calles remained the power behind the presidency, during a period known as the Maximato, but his hand-picked presidential candidate, Lázaro Cárdenas, won a power struggle with Calles, expelling him from the country. Cárdenas reorganized the party that Calles founded, creating formal sectors for interest groups, including one for the Mexican military. The reorganized party was named Party of the Mexican Revolution. In 1946, the party again changed its name to the Institutional Revolutionary Party. The party under its various names held the presidency uninterruptedly from 1929 to 2000, and again from 2012 to 2018 under President Enrique Peña Nieto. In 1988, Cuauhtémoc Cárdenas, son of president Lázaro Cárdenas, broke with the PRI, forming an independent leftist party, the Party of the Democratic Revolution, or PRD. It is not by chance that the party used the word "Revolution" in its name, challenging the Institutional Revolutionary Party's appropriation of the Mexican Revolution.

The PRI was built as a big-tent corporatist party, to bring many political factions and interest groups (peasantry, labor, urban professionals) together, while excluding conservatives and Catholics, who eventually formed the opposition National Action Party in 1939. To incorporate the populace into the party, Presidents Calles and Cárdenas created an institutional structure to bring in popular, agrarian, labor, and popular sectors. Cárdenas reorganized the party in 1938, controversially bringing in the military as a sector. His successor President Avila Camacho reorganized the party into its final form, removing the military. This channeled both political patronage and limited political options of those sectors. This structure strengthened the power of the PRI and the government. Union and peasant leaders themselves gained power of patronage, and the discontent of the membership was channeled through them. If organizational leaders could not resolve a situation or gain benefits for their members, it was they who were blamed for being ineffective brokers. There was the appearance of union and peasant leagues' power, but the effective power was in the hands of the PRI. Under PRI leadership before the 2000 elections which saw the conservative National Action Party elected most power came from a Central Executive Committee, which budgeted all government projects. This in effect turned the legislature into a rubber stamp for the PRI's leadership. The Party's name is aimed at expressing the Mexican state's incorporation of the idea of revolution, and especially a continuous, nationalist, anti-imperialist, Mexican revolution, into political discourse, and its legitimization as a popular, revolutionary party. According to historian Alan Knight, the memory of the revolution became a sort of "secular religion" that justified the Party's rule.

=== Social changes ===
Logo for the leftist Party of Democratic Revolution

The Mexican Revolution brought about various social changes. First, the leaders of the Porfiriato lost their political power (but kept their economic power), and the middle class started to enter the public administration. "At this moment the bureaucrat, the government officer, the leader were born [...]". The army opened the sociopolitical system and the leaders in the Constitutionalist faction, particularly Álvaro Obregón and Plutarco Elías Calles, controlled the central government for more than a decade after the military phase ended in 1920. The creation of the PNR in 1929 brought generals into the political system, but as an institution, the army's power as an interventionist force was tamed, most directly under Lázaro Cárdenas, who in 1936 incorporated the army as a sector in the new iteration of the party, the Revolutionary Party of Mexico (PRM). The old federal army had been destroyed during the revolution, and the new collection of revolutionary fighters were brought under state control.

Although the proportion between rural and urban population, and the number of workers and the middle class remained practically the same, the Mexican Revolution brought substantial qualitative changes to the cities. Big rural landlords moved to the city escaping from chaos in the rural areas. Some poor farmers also migrated to the cities, and they settled on neighborhoods where the Porfiriato elite used to live. The standard of living in the cities grew: it went from contributing to 42% of the national GDP to 60% by 1940. However, social inequality remained.

The greatest change occurred among the rural population. The agrarian reform allowed some revolutionary men to have access to land, (ejidos), that remained under control of the government. However, the structure of land ownership for ejidetarios did not promote rural development and impoverished the rural population even further. "From 1934 to 1940 wages fell 25% on rural areas, while for city workers wages increased by 20%". "There was a lack of food, there was not much to sell and even less to buy. [...] the habit of sleeping in the floor remains, [...] diet is limited to beans, tortilla, and chili pepper; clothing is poor". Peasants temporarily migrated to other regions to work in the production of certain crops where they were frequently exploited, abused, and suffered from various diseases. Others decided to migrate to the United States.

A modern legacy of revolution in the rural sphere is the Chiapas insurgency of the 1990s, taking its name from Emiliano Zapata, the Zapatista Army of National Liberation (Ejército Zapatista de Liberación Nacional). The neo-Zapatista revolt began in Chiapas, which was very reliant and supportive of the revolutionary reforms, especially the ejido system, which it had pioneered before Cárdenas took power. Most revolutionary gains were reversed in the early 1990s by President Salinas, who began moving away from the agrarian policies of the late post revolution period in favor of modern capitalism. This culminated in the dismantling of the ejido system in Chiapas, removing many landless peasants' hope of achieving access to land. Calling to Mexico's revolutionary heritage, the EZLN draws heavily on early revolutionary rhetoric. It is inspired by many of Zapata's policies, including a call for decentralized local rule.

=== Reaction of Mexican Americans ===
While the war was raging in Mexico, Mexicans and Mexican Americans living in the United States had a multitude of reaction and responses to the war. These responses were not unified, however, as class, race, regional origins, and political ideologies contributed to a large amount of different reactions from the Mexican diaspora in the United States. Furthermore, not all Mexicans had the same citizenship status, with some being immigrants, refugees, exiles, or people whose family had lived in the south-western states from Texas to California since before the Mexican–American War. Within Mexicans and Mexican Americans, there was a wide political spectrum present, from extreme anarchists, to conservative counterrevolutionaries. Some of these groups included Tejano Progressives who supported the revolution and actively helped out by raising awareness to social justice, and Border Anarchists who were a more radical group that participated in violence.

=== Memory and myth of the Revolution ===
The violence of the Revolution is a powerful memory. Mexican survivors of the Revolution desired a lasting peace and were willing to accept a level of "political deficiencies" to maintain peace and stability. The memory of the revolution was used as justification for the [Institutional Revolutionary] party's policies with regard to economic nationalism, educational policies, labour policies, indigenismo and land reform. Mexico commemorates the Revolution in monuments, statues, school textbooks, naming of cities, neighborhoods, and streets, images on peso notes and coins.

== See also ==
- United States involvement in the Mexican Revolution
- Mexican Border War (1910–1919)
- Military history of Mexico
- List of factions in the Mexican Revolution
- List of wars involving Mexico
- List of Mexican Revolution and Cristero War films
- Partido Revolucionario Institucional
- Sonora in the Mexican Revolution
- Bourgeois revolution
