= Luis N. Morones =

Mexican politician

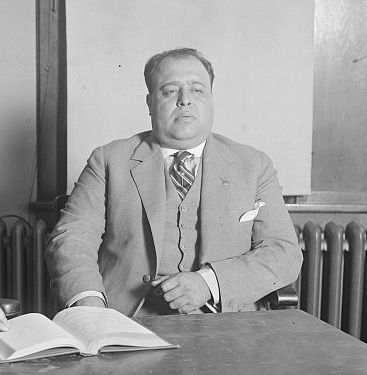
Luis N. Morones

Luis Morones Negrete (1890 – 1964), also known as Luis Napoleón Morones, was a participant in the Mexican revolution, a Mexican major union leader, and government official. He was a controversial politician who experienced a rapid rise to prominence from modest roots and made strategic alliances. He served as Secretary General of the Regional Confederation of Mexican Workers (Confederación Regional Obrera Mexicana, CROM) and as secretary of economy under President Plutarco Elías Calles, 1924-1928. He is considered the "most important union leader of the 1920s"...and undoubtedly an influential figure in Mexico's post-Revolutionary reconstruction." He was criticized for accepting a position in the national government while heading a labor union, an obvious conflict of interest. He was known for his unseemly displays of great wealth. He fell from power following the successful 1928 presidential run by Alvaro Obregon, who was assassinated before being inaugurated.

== Early life ==
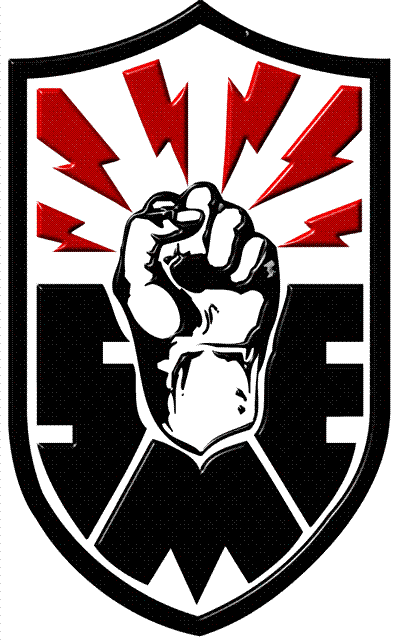
Logo of the Sindicato Mexicano de Electricistas

Morones was born 11 October 1890 in Tlalpan, a delegación of the Mexican Federal District, the only child of Ignacio Morones and his wife Rafaela Negrete, both cotton textile weavers in Jalisco. Married in 1888, the couple moved to the capital in order to find jobs in the textile factory of San Fernando in Tlalpan. The factory closed in 1895 and the couple was in straiten circumstances, but did not return to Jalisco. The family was aided by Rafaela's nine sisters, whose help allowed Luis to attend and finish primary school. He also learned typing and shorthand, skills he never used. Although his parents wished him to become a weaver, at age 17 Luis began working as an electrician, repairing all types of electrical motors. His electrician's card identifies him as "Luis N. Morones."

In the early years of the Mexican Revolution, he joined the radical Casa del Obrero Mundial (House of the World Worker, COS) in 1913, then helped found the electricians' union, Mexican Syndicate of Electricians (SME), based in the Mexican Telephone and Telegraph Co., in 1915. The SME later joined the COS.

During the Revolution, he supported the Constitutionalist faction, as well as its civilian leader, Venustiano Carranza, who became president of Mexico following the defeat of other factions. Carranza sought the support of labor against his foes, especially revolutionary generals Emiliano Zapata, leader of the Revolution in Morelos, and Carranza's former Constitutionalist general, Pancho Villa. Carranza's best general, Alvaro Obregón remained loyal to Carranza, and was tasked with gaining support from labor. Urban workers joined the Constitutionalist faction, forming Red Battalions to fight against the peasant army led by Zapata. They made a significant contribution to the Constitutionalist cause, and a number of their leaders became prominent in the CROM. Morones did not commit himself full force to the Constitutionalists, hedging his bets if they did not win. With Obregón's defeat of Villa at the Battle of Celaya in 1915, the Constitutionalists took power with Carranza becoming president. Although Carranza had needed organized labor at an earlier point, he backed away from supporting it. The electrical workers participated in a general strike in Mexico City in 1916. Carranza was incensed, viewing the strike as treasonous and threatened capital punishment for its organizers. He closed the Casa de Obrero Mundial. Obregón intervened to prevent Morones's execution, but he was imprisoned for a time and then left the capital for a provincial exile in Pachuca.

== Rise to power and fall ==
Logo of the Laborist Party of Mexico, founded by Morones

U.S. labor leader Samuel Gompers, head of the American Federation of Labor, reached out to labor leaders in Mexico, including Morones. Gompers invited Mexican labor leaders to send a delegation to a meeting at the U.S.-Mexico border at El Paso, Texas in 1916. Morones and Mexican painter and revolutionary Dr. Atl were chosen as delegates. Twelve U.S. soldiers were killed and 23 captured at the border and President Woodrow Wilson threatened war with Mexico, if they were not released. An intervention by Mexican labor leaders and Gompers helped avert war, with prisoners released and war threats withdrawn. Gompers and Morones became labor allies.

From 1916 to 1918 Morones participated in political and labor organizations and congresses and by 1920 he was head of the CROM. He supported the anti-Carranza faction in 1920, when Carranza attempted to install the civilian Ignacio Bonillas as his successor. Three revolutionary generals from Sonora, Alvaro Obregón, Adolfo de la Huerta, and Plutarco Elías Calles revolted against Carranza under the Plan of Agua Prieta. Morones supported Obregón and helped broker his accession to the presidency in 1920, when new elections were held. During Obregón's administration he was in charge of the government munitions industry.

In 1922, he founded the Mexican Labor Party (or PLM) and its organ El Sol, and was elected to the Chamber of Deputies of Mexico in Tacubaya, where his prime role consisted of mediating between the working class and government elites. His cooperation brought him into conflicts with communist and socialist elements of the union movement.

Morones had supported Calles in the 1923 armed conflict between Calles and De la Huerta for succession to the presidency in the 1924 elections. Calles rewarded him for his loyalty by appointing him as the nation's Secretary of Industry, Commerce, and Labor in 1924. At the same time he continued serving as head of CROM, using his office to weaken rival labor organizations. This period was the apex of Morones's power in Mexico. His fall was swift, however.

In the election of 1928, Obregón sought to run again. Morones opposed his candidacy, and along with the CROM broke with Obregón's Mexican Laborist Party as well. Obregón won, but he was assassinated before taking office. Obregón died at the hands of a religious fanatic in 1928, but rumors that Morones was involved circulated and Calles forced him to resign.

Morones and other leaders of the CROM had enriched themselves through corrupt practices in the 1920s. Morones possessed large property holdings in his Tlalpan neighbourhood and owned a luxury hotel in Mexico City. He flaunted his ill-gotten wealth with displays of diamond rings and expensive cars, leading to charges of hypocrisy and corruption.

As a result, the influence of the CROM was weakened among its rank-and-file base, and unions in the confederation began deserting it. Morones lost more of his political power in the period from 1928 to 1932, during the period of Calles's indirect rule known as the Maximato.

In 1936, Morones was arrested in connection with the attempted dynamiting of a train, which the Cárdenas government regarded as part of a conspiracy against it. Morones was forced into exile, along with Calles and the last remaining highly influential callistas in Mexico. He lived in Atlantic City, New Jersey, returning to Mexico years later.
