= Benjamín G. Hill =

Mexican general (1874-1920)

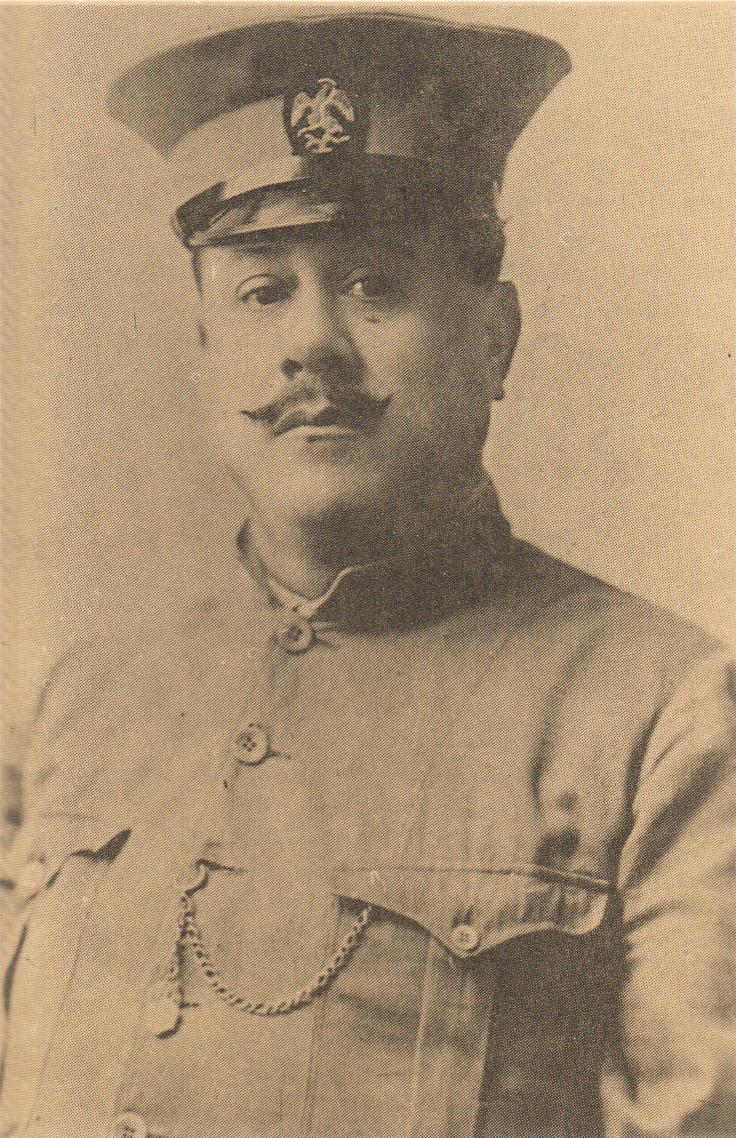
- Hill c. 1910–1920
- Born: 31 March 1874; San Antonio, Choix Municipality, Sinaloa
- Died: 14 December 1920 (aged 46); Mexico City
- Military career
- Allegiance: Constitutionalist Army, Mexican Army
- Service years: 1910 – 1920
- Rank: General
- Conflicts: Mexican Revolution
- Other work: Governor of Sonora, Secretary of National Defence

Gen. Benjamín Guillermo Hill Salido (31 March 1874 – 14 December 1920) was a military commander during the Mexican Revolution. He was a cousin of revolutionary general and later president Álvaro Obregón Salido, whom he supported from the beginning of his rise to power. He was called "Obregón's lost right arm," alluding to the arm his cousin lost in the 1915 Battle of Celaya, defeating General Pancho Villa.

== Early life ==
Hill's paternal grandfather, William Hill, was an American-born physician who fought with the army of the Confederate States of America in the American Civil War (1861–65). As with a number of Confederates following the southern defeat, Hill emigrated. He went to Álamos, Sonora, where he married Jesusa Salido. Their third child was Benjamín Hill Salido. He was born in San Antonio, Choix Municipality, Sinaloa. Jesusa's sister Cenobia, who had eighteen children, the last of which was Álvaro Obregón Salido, making Hill and Obregón cousins. While the Obregón family's fortunes waned, especially after the death of Cenobia's husband when Obregón was a toddler, the Hill family sent Benjamin to study in a military academy and then sent him to Milan and Rome. He fell in love with an Italian countess, whose family objected to the match, but the couple eloped and returned to Mexico. She died in childbirth during her first pregnancy. Hill subsequently married a local Sonoran woman.

== Career ==
Upon his return to Mexico in 1908, Hill was named a regidor (city councillor) in Navojoa, Sonora. Following the call of Francisco I. Madero he joined the revolution in 1910. He was briefly imprisoned in Hermosillo on orders of the Governor of Sonora, though he escaped in April 1911. He used what was called the "nitroglycerine method of attack," a method used when Federal forces had overwhelming numbers. Rebels also used dum-dum bullets that did lethal damage. The press in Mexico City criticized such methods as being "unchivalrous.". When Madero was trying to consolidate his hold, he placed Hill as commander of Cananea, a place of labor unrest. Hill "a combination of resolve and conciliation averted trouble."

In 1912, he fought against the rebellion led by Pascual Orozco and, following the 1913 coup d'état of Victoriano Huerta, he joined the northwestern corps of the Constitutionalist Army, which would ultimately be commanded by his kinsman Álvaro Obregón. He fought alongside Obregón in the campaigns against Francisco "Pancho" Villa in the Bajío. He served as Governor of Sonora from 12 August 1914 until 6 January 1915. Obregón had not joined the early Maderista phase of the revolution, but once he did, Hill supported his rise in military ranks despite grumblings of some who had fought for Madero.

Hill was an extremely able Constitutionalist Army commander, put in charge of Mexico City in 1915. Following the victory of Venustiano Carranza's Constitutionalist Army, whose most distinguished general was his relative Álvaro Obregón, Hill was promoted to Divisional General.

Obregón had returned to Sonora after Carranza's election, but announced his candidacy for the 1920 presidential elections in which Carranza was constitutionally unable to run. However, Carranza designated Ignacio Bonillas as his candidate for the presidency. Hill, Obregón, Plutarco Elías Calles, and Adolfo de la Huerta formed a plan in 1920 against Carranza's plans. Hill was one of the main proponents of the Plan of Agua Prieta, fighting in the military rebellions that ensued. Hill and other former Constitutionalists accompanied Obregón on his triumphal entry into Mexico City.

When Obregón assumed the presidency on 1 December 1920, he appointed Hill as his Secretary of War and the Navy. He was seen as a potential presidential successor to Obregón, which brought him into conflict with Interior Secretary Plutarco Elías Calles.

== Death and legacy ==
In 1920, Hill died at age 46 under suspicious circumstances after attending a luncheon intended to heal a rift between Hill and Calles. Calles was also in conflict with the poet José Inés Novelo. After dining, both Hill and Novelo became extremely ill; Novelo recovered, but Hill did not. Calles was suspected of poisoning Novelo and Hill, Obregón's kinsman and potential rival to Calles politically. The banquet was called "The Feast of the Borgias", a family that famously used poison to eliminate rivals. A rumor was floated that Hill had died of cancer. Hill had served only two weeks as Obregón's Minister of War. He was given a full military funeral with Obregón, Calles, and other revolutionaries in attendance. Calles succeeded him in the post of Minister of War.

The town of Benjamín Hill, Sonora, was named in his honor.
