= Bucareli Treaty =

1923 agreement between Mexico and the United States

The Bucareli Treaty (Spanish: Tratado de Bucareli), officially the Convención Especial de Reclamaciones (Special Convention of Claims), was an agreement signed on August 13, 1923 between Mexico and United States. It settled losses by U.S. companies during the Mexican Revolution. It also dealt with the illegality of potential expropriation of American landholding and subsoils for the sake of Mexican public use, as well as the ways of calculating compensation and forms of payment, if an expropriation was deemed necessary.

The treaty sought to channel the demands of U.S. citizens for alleged damage to their property caused by internal wars of the Mexican Revolution from 1910 to 1921. The meetings were held in Mexico City and were conducted in a building owned by the federal government of Mexico at 85 Bucareli Street, hence the treaty's nickname. Negotiations began on May 15, 1923, and ended on August 13. The treaty was signed by Mexican President Álvaro Obregón, primarily to obtain diplomatic recognition from the U.S. government, led by President Warren G. Harding. But the ratification processes were ambiguous in the United States, and even violent and unrecognized in Mexico.

Mexican President Plutarco Elías Calles agreed to comply with this treaty after negotiation, but afterward canceled the treaty.

== Background ==
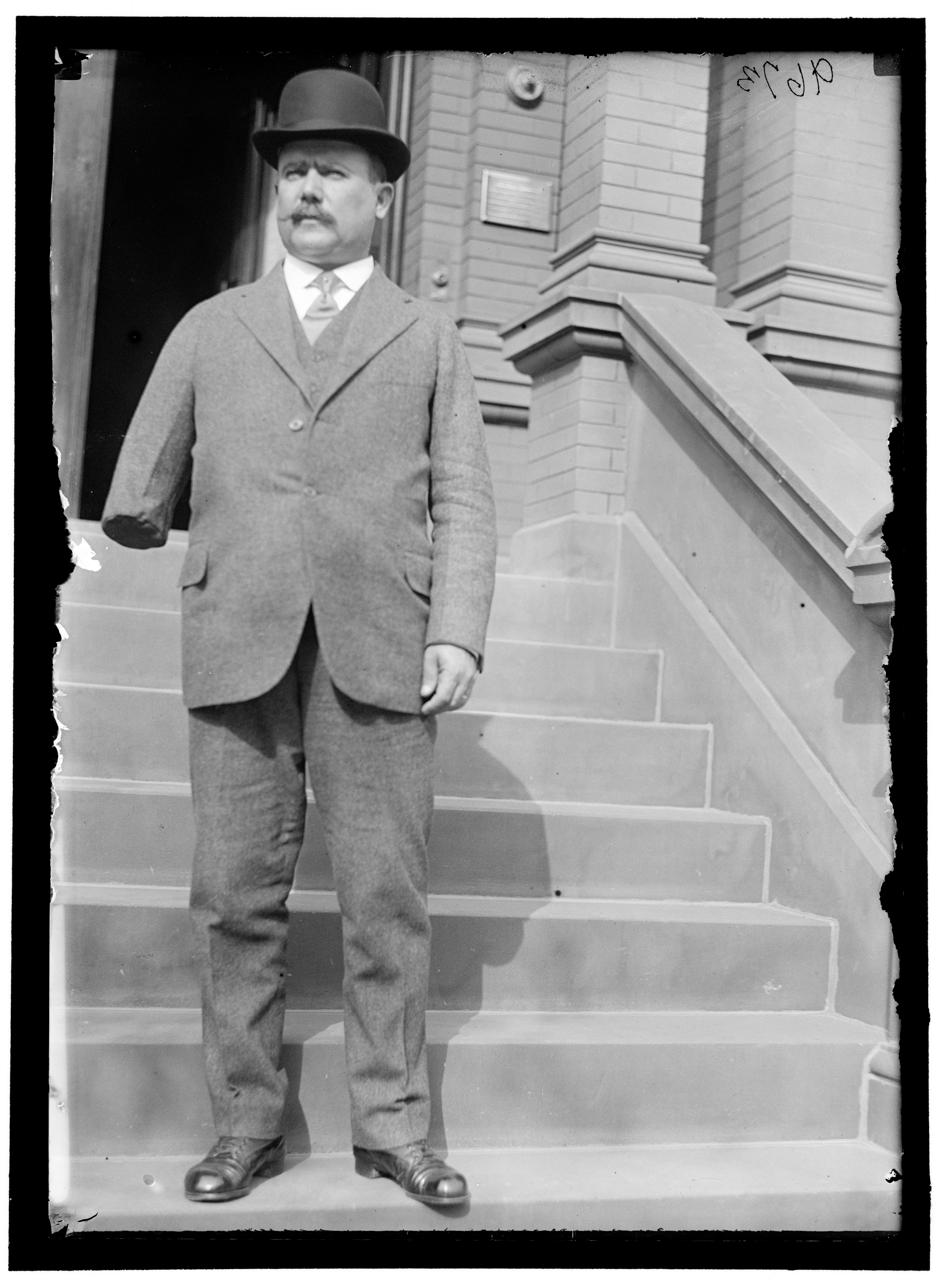
Mexican President Álvaro Obregón (December 1, 1920 – November 30, 1924)

The situation in Mexico was marked by political instability and constant military revolts. Part of the relative weakness of President Álvaro Obregón's government came from the fact that the United States had not recognized the postrevolutionary regime.

The 1917 Mexican Constitution, with its strong socialist and nationalist influence, had hurt many U.S. interests, which made U.S. President Warren G. Harding refuse to recognize Obregón as legitimate. The U.S. also demanded the repeal of several articles of the Mexican Constitution of 1917 or at least their exemption for the U.S. For Obregón, U.S. recognition of his government was a priority to avoid the constant threat of war. Barely nine years earlier, the U.S. had occupied Veracruz. Recognition was also essential for Obregón to deal with the internal split and regional rebellion, as we have seen later in the Delahuertista rebellion in December 1923.

The devastation and the disorder caused by the Mexican Revolution made Obregón consider foreign direct investment to be necessary to rebuild the Mexican economy, but the U.S. conditioned its recognition of Obregon with a treaty by which Mexico would guarantee the rights of property of U.S. citizens living in Mexico and U.S. oil companies operating in Mexico. The oil problem stemmed from Article 27 of the Mexican Constitution, which stated that Mexico was in direct control of everything on Mexican soil. That affected possession and extraction of oil by U.S. and European oil companies.

The low-profile negotiations that led to the treaty took place from May to August 1923 at the Secretariat of the Interior building on Avenida Bucareli, in Mexico City.

The following conditions were demanded by the U.S. to the Mexican government:

- The content of Article 27 of the Constitution to specify the legal situation of oil industry and agricultural properties of foreigners.
- The payment of the external debt, suspended during the government of Mexican President Venustiano Carranza, to be resumed.
- Compensation to be paid to foreigners for damages to their persons or property during the revolutionary struggle.

The Mexican Supreme Court of Justice granted and determined that Article 27 would not be retroactive for the oil industry, saying that any expropriation should be made with indemnification. As for the resumption of external debt payments, Obregón tried to obtain funds by new taxes on oil, but the oil companies opposed the increase, stopped production, and forced the government to repeal the tax.

== Terms ==
The Bucareli Treaty generally refers to all agreements reached in the Bucareli negotiation, including the General Conventions (the exoteric part) and Special Conventions (also referred as the minutes part).

The General Conventions, signed by Álvaro Obregón on August 13, 1923, included the following terms:

- All damages on the U.S. investment due to the Mexican Revolution should be compensated at a fair value.

However, the Special Conventions part was reached verbally and was not documented in the signed treaty itself. On behalf of Obregón, the Mexican commissioners informally reached an agreement with the following terms with the U.S. counterparts:

- The agricultural properties expropriated from the U.S. would be paid with bonds for those no more than 1755 hectares.
- For properties that exceeded that size, payment would be immediate and in cash.
- A commission would be created and responsible for reviewing pending claims from 1868, but claims arising out of the revolution would be solved separately.
- Article 27 would not be retroactive to U.S. citizens who had acquired their leases before 1917, which allowed them to continue freely exploiting oil.

Since the Special Conventions was agreed upon secretly, it only represented President Obregón's personal will. It caused the problems with the ratification process in both countries as well as the Delahuertista rebellion.

== Ratification ==
Mexicans and American agents reacted differently to either part (the General Conventions and Special Conventions) of the treaty, which led to different outcomes.

The American Senate requested the unknown “minutes” not written in the Bucareli Treaty after ratification. This request, recorded by Francisco de Valesco, showed the fact that the American Senate was not given information about the Special Conventions in the process of approving the General Conventions, and they inadvertently passed the Special Conventions along with the General Conventions. Later, the senators acquiesced on the Special Conventions after Charles Evans Hughes informed the Senate of the truth. In regards to the absence of further discussion in the American Senate, we could conclude that the entire Bucareli Treaty was technically approved, if not in a strict sense of legislative ratification.

For Mexico, the story was more complicated. President Obregón could hardly have the treaty approved without brutal measures in February 1924. As Vito Alessio Robles, then a senator in 1923, documented, “The General Claims Conventions, stained with the blood of one senator and the kidnapping of three others, was approved by twenty-eight votes against fourteen negative [2/3].” Even with such extreme measures, the approval rate of the General Conventions just reached the threshold of a supermajority. Robles also recalled no discussion of the General Conventions in the Senate beyond straight approval, and he believed the agreement was too personal to represent the Mexican government. This lack of discussion and corresponding debate reduced the credibility of the treaty, even though it was technically passed. Also, Adolfo de la Huerta, a former president and a core player at the time, also confirmed that Obregón removed those minutes off from conversations in the cabinet, implying that the Special Conventions was even hidden from the core members of the administration.

Overall, the undemocratic way of approval, the lack of negotiations in the cabinet, along with the bloody measures, was ultimately not only undesirable but also detrimental to the legitimacy of the treaty, even the administration itself. This effect finally manifested itself in December 1923 and the reactions of subsequent administrations.

== Consequences ==
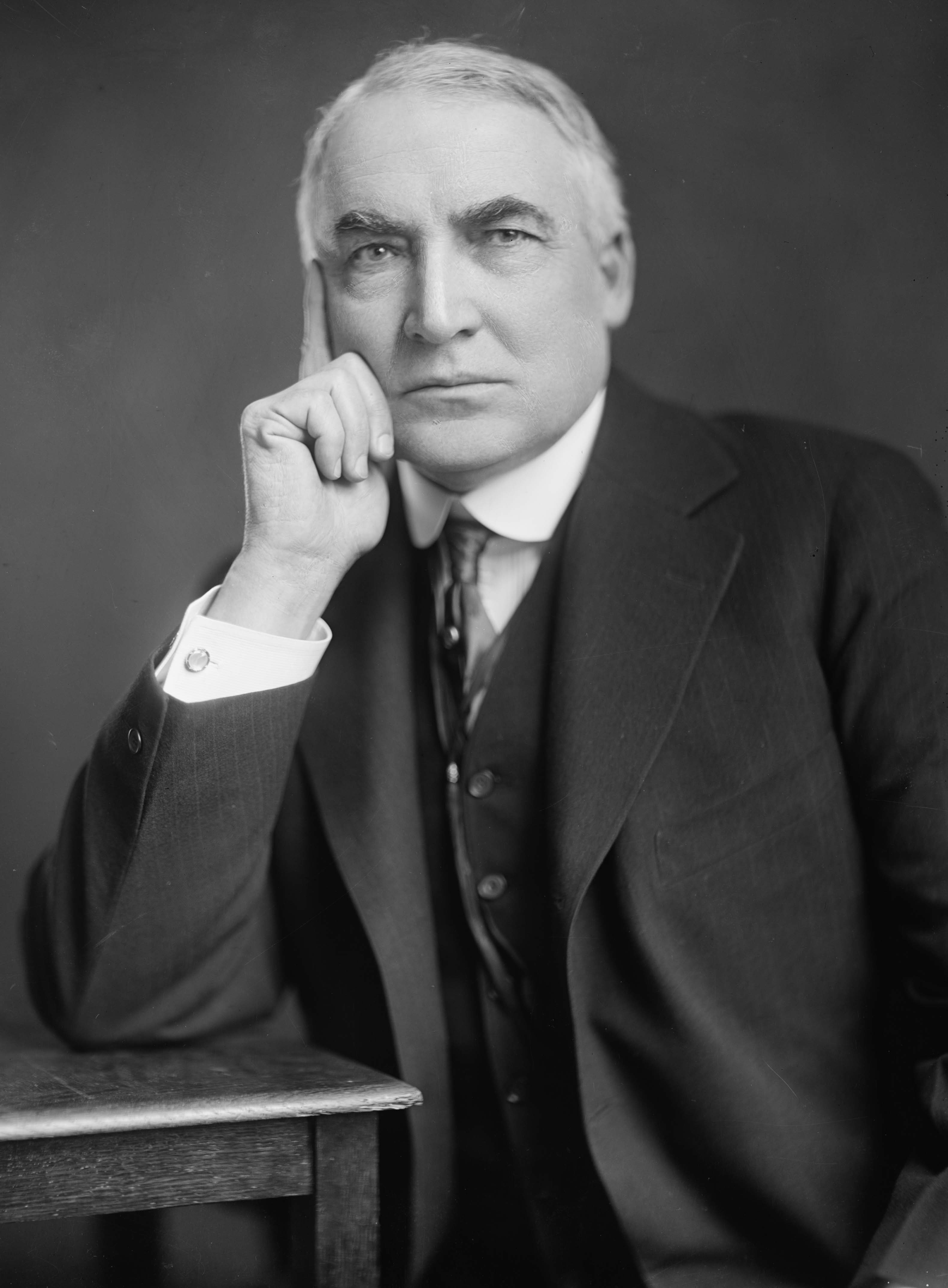
U.S. President Warren G. Harding (March 4, 1921 – August 2, 1923)

Claims had to be met for a period of two years and processed within five years from the signing of the treaty. However, the treaty lacked legal validity because it was not formally and legitimately approved by the Congresses of both signatory countries. It was in a gentleman's agreement that bound only Obregón, not his successors. However, his government was recognized by the United States. The amount of money paid to Americans under Obregon is still unknown.

The former interim president, Adolfo de la Huerta, who was in Obregon's cabinet as Secretary of the Treasury, asserted that the treaty violated the national sovereignty and subjected Mexico to humiliating conditions. De la Huerta accused Obregón of treason against the nation but was accused of incompetence in the performance of his duties and was made responsible for Mexico's financial plight. De la Huerta resigned and moved to Veracruz, where he launched a manifesto that set off the Delahuertista rebellion in December 1923.

A common myth in Mexico is that the treaty forbade Mexico to produce specialized machinery (engines, aircraft, etc.) and so delayed for many years Mexico's economic development. It has been argued that from 1910 to 1930, civil wars, military coups, and rebellions devastated the industries in Mexico and stopped higher education, research, and technological development and that the social and political instability also drove off the foreign investments.

The revolution did not actually destroy the industrial sector, factories, extractive facilities, or industrial entrepreneurs and so once the fighting had ended in 1917, production resumed.

The full text of the Bucareli Treaty was published after it had been signed and shows no prohibition on technology.

== Cancellation ==
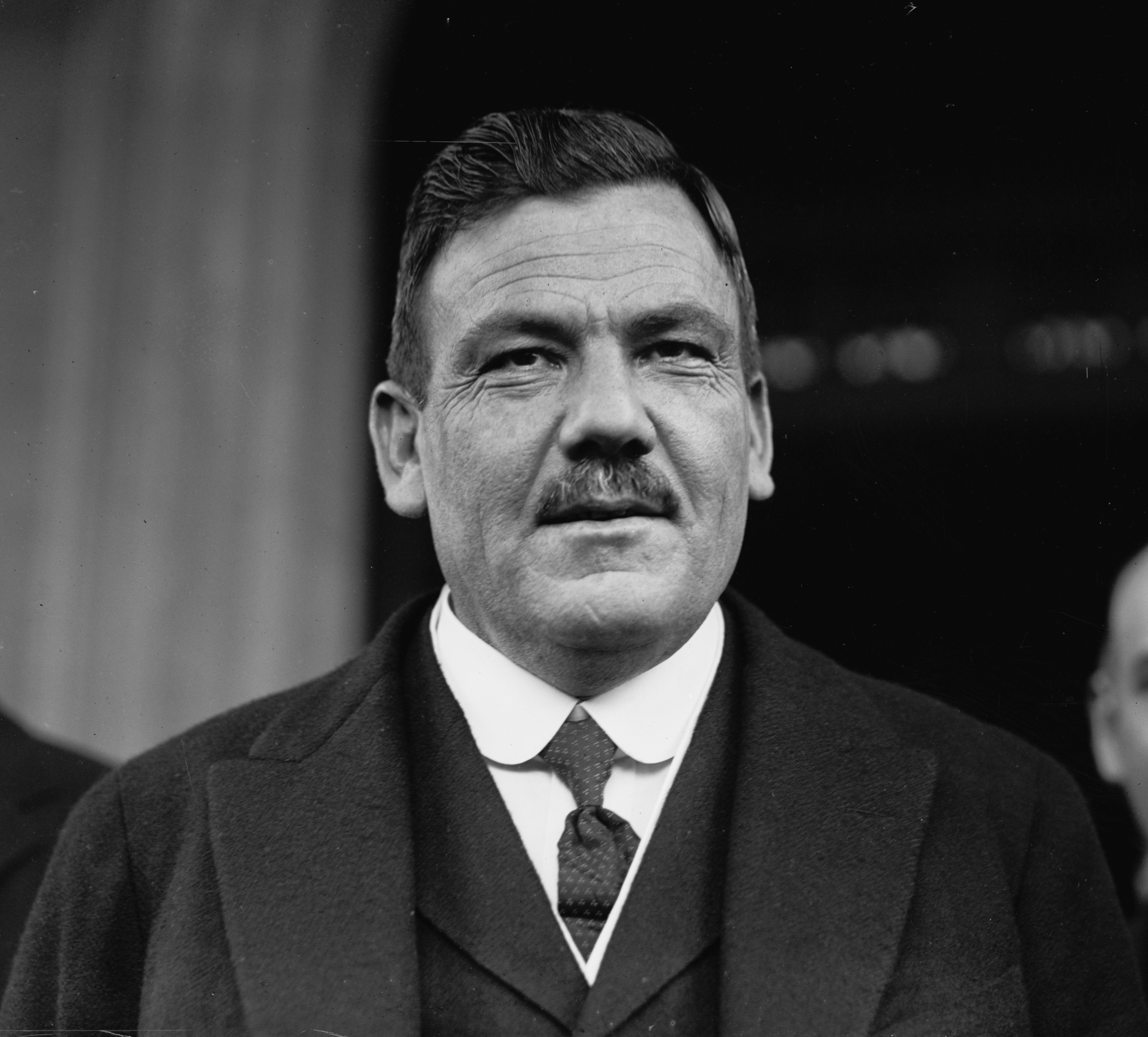
Plutarco Elías Calles, President of Mexico (December 1, 1924 - November 30, 1928)

When Plutarco Elías Calles took office on December 1, 1924, one of the main points of contention between the United States and Mexico remained oil. Calles initially had a meeting with American Ambassador Dwight Morrow and verbally agreed to comply with the Special Conventions. After that, Calles quickly rejected the Bucareli Treaty and began drafting a new oil law that strictly fulfilled Article 27 of the Mexican Constitution. The U.S. government's reaction was immediate. The U.S. ambassador to Mexico, James Rockwell Sheffield called Calles a "communist," and the U.S. secretary of state, Frank Billings Kellogg, issued a threat against Mexico on June 12, 1925.

U.S. public opinion turned against Mexico after the first embassy of the Soviet Union in the world had opened in Mexico. Also, the Soviet ambassador said that no country in the world had more similarities to the Soviet Union than Mexico. Afterwards, members of the U.S. government considered Mexico to be the world's second Bolshevik country and began to call it "Soviet Mexico."

The debate on the new oil law was in 1925, with U.S. interests opposed to any initiative. In 1926, the new law was enacted. In January 1927, the Calles government cancelled permits to oil companies that did not meet the law. Mexico managed to avoid war by a series of diplomatic maneuvers. Soon, a direct telephone hotline was established between Calles and U.S. President Calvin Coolidge. Also, Sheffield was replaced by Dwight Morrow. On March 18, 1938, after a series of contempt for foreign oil companies, Mexican President Lázaro Cárdenas del Río decreed the Mexican oil expropriation, creating PEMEX.

== Sources ==
=== Books ===
- CASASOLA, Gustavo: "Historia Gráfica de la Revolución Mexicana. Tomo 1", Madrid, España, Editorial Trillas, 1992. ISBN 968-24-4524-8
- "Seis siglos de historia gráfica de México, tomo 12", Mexico, Editorial Trillas, 1976. ISBN 968-7013-00-1
- ESQUIVEL MILÁN, Gloria — colaboración con Enrique Figueroa Alfonso —: "Historia de México", Oxford, Editorial Harla, 1996. ISBN 970-613-092-6
- FUENTES MARES, José: "Historia Ilustrada de México, de Hernán Cortés a Miguel de la Madrid. Tomo II", Mexico, Editorial Océano, 1984. ISBN 968-491-047-9
- KRAUZE, Enrique: "Álvaro Obregón, el vértigo de la victoria", Mexico, Fondo de Cultura Económica, 1987. ISBN 968-16-2785-7
- MORENO, Salvador — colaboración con Amalia Silva —: "Historia de México", Mexico, Ediciones Pedagógicas, 1995. ISBN 968-417-230-3
- ROSAS, Alejandro: "Mitos de la historia mexicana. De Hidalgo a Zedillo", Mexico, Editorial Planeta, 2006. ISBN 970-37-0555-3
- SILVA CAZARES, Carlos: "Álvaro Obregón", en la serie "Grandes protagonistas de la historia mexicana", Mexico: Planeta DeAgostini, 2002. ISBN 970-726-081-5
- TREVIÑO, Héctor Jaime: "Historia de México", Monterrey, Ediciones Castillo, 1997. ISBN 970-20-0019-X
- VASCONCELOS, José: "Breve historia de México", Mexico, Editorial Trillas — colección "Linterna mágica" —, 1998. ISBN 968-24-4924-3
- VILLALPANDO, José Manuel — colaboración con Alejandro Rosas —: "Los Presidentes de México", Mexico, Editorial Planeta, 2001. ISBN 970-690-507-3
- MARTIN MORENO, Francisco: "México Acribillado", Mexico, Editorial Alfaguara, 2008. ISBN 978-970-58-0456-4
- Moreno Suarez, Adolfo; I. Paniagua Arredondo, José. Los Tratados de Bucareli: Traicion y Sangre Sobre Mexico.
- Trujillo Herrera, Rafael (1966). Adolfo de la Huerta y los Tratados de Bucareli. Librería de Manuel Porrúa.

=== Documentaries ===
- Álvaro Obregón, El Vértigo de la Victoria, Arturo Pérez Velasco, 1999.
- México: Revolution and Rebirth, History Channel, 1999.
