= Sonora in the Mexican Revolution =

Modern map of Sonora. To the north is the U.S., to the south, the state of Sinaloa, to the east, the state of Chihuahua

Sonora was a crucial region of the Mexican Revolution, with its main leaders called the Sonoran Dynasty or the Sonoran Triumvirate, that collectively ruled Mexico for fifteen years from 1920 to 1935. The northwestern state of Sonora was geographically and culturally distinct from other states of Mexico, including other parts of northern Mexico. Because of its geographical isolation from other parts of Mexico, its close ties with the United States, its large-scale export agriculture, its distinct indigenous populations, and its broad-based participation in the Revolution its leaders had a different worldview from central Mexico. Four Sonorans became Presidents of Mexico, Adolfo de la Huerta, Álvaro Obregón, Plutarco Elías Calles, and Abelardo L. Rodríguez. Seven other important figures of the revolution also come from Sonora or in nearby states, José María Maytorena and Benjamín G. Hill, both middle class; Manuel Diéguez, Salvador Alvarado, and Juan G. Cabral; and Francisco R. Serrano and Arnulfo R. Gómez. Although not formally a member of the Sonora Dynasty, Michoacan-born General Lázaro Cárdenas, later President of Mexico, was part of the revolutionary circle of Plutarco Elías Calles, right until the point that President Cárdenas forced former President Calles into exile in 1936. Only in recent years have historians begun focusing on the role of Sonora and the Sonoran Dynasty in Mexican Revolution, shifting from an emphasis on populist leaders like Francisco Villa of Chihuahua and Emiliano Zapata of Morelos. The Sonoran leaders sought greater material betterment for impoverished Mexicans, sought to centralize authority, and diminish the role of the Catholic Church. As with Díaz's Científicos, they believed in the importance of material progress, public education (as one way to counter the influence of the Catholic Church), and rationalism.

== Sonora as a distinct region ==
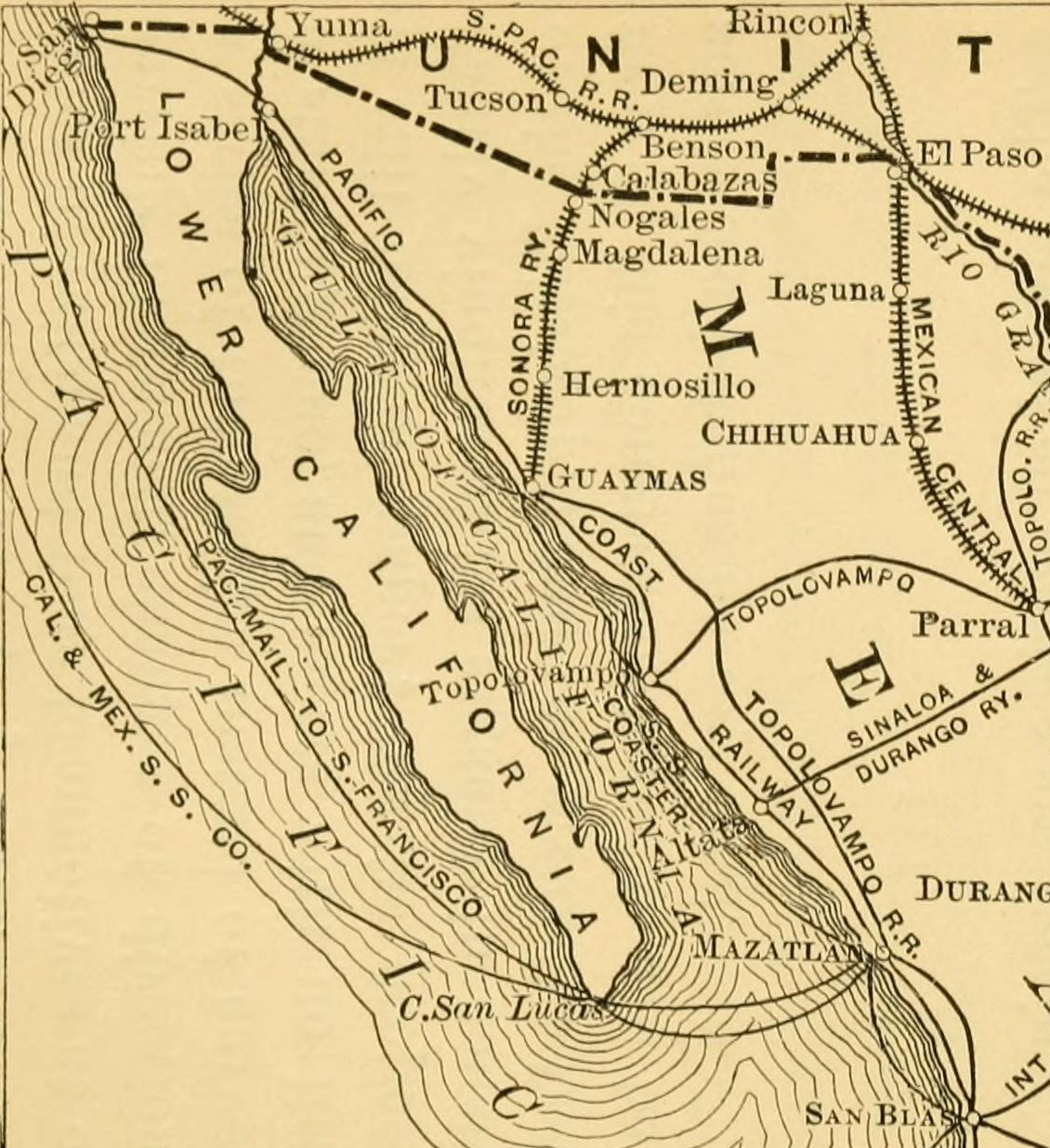
California and Mexico Steamship Company Line map, 1883. Sonora had no direct railway to Mexico City, but one from Guaymas to the U.S. border at Nogales.

Sonora had a number of indigenous populations that played an important role in the state's socioeconomic history. The Yaqui and Mayo held territory along rich valleys of the Yaqui and Mayo rivers, which became targets for non-indigenous colonists. The Yaqui in particular fiercely defended their ancestral holdings and under indigenous leader Cajeme held territory for over a decade against outsiders. They had a long history of resistance to the dispossession of their land, dating from the colonial era and continuing into post-independence Mexico. Even after the defeat of Cajeme and his followers, Yaqui either actively or passively resisted outsiders. In the late nineteenth century, Yaqui and Mayo laborers sought paid agricultural employment as well mining. The Díaz government tried and failed to put an end to Yaqui resistance, and resorted to wholesale forced deportation of Yaqui to Yucatán, where they were put to work on henequen plantations that exported sisal to the U.S. American journalist John Kenneth Turner's described the deportation in vivid detail in Barbarous Mexico.

== Foreign immigration to Sonora ==
A number of immigrants from the U.S. settled in Sonora during the late nineteenth century, including Mormons. Since the U.S. was hostile to this religious group because of their practice of polygamy. Initially Mormons moved to the west of the U.S., and they settled in large number in Utah before it became a state and polygamy was forbidden. After the U.S. Civil War (1861–1865), the U.S. government began prosecuting Mormons for polygamy. After 1885, some Mormons from Utah, Idaho, and Colorado saw northern Mexico as a destination for starting a new life, since the central government and the Catholic Church had a weak hold there. While the neighboring state of Chihuahua was the site of early Mormon colonies, Mormons settled in eastern Sonora, Colonia Morelos and Colonia Oaxaca along the Rio Bavispe. Some Sonorans were hostile, while a Mormon settler in Sinaloa said the "normally suspicious and resistant Yaqui received them with open arms."

Chinese immigrated to northern Mexico, including Sonora, particularly after the U.S. passed the Chinese Exclusion Act in 1882, first settling in the port of Guaymas. They came as single-male, largely unskilled laborers, but many became small business owners of stores, laundries, and restaurants. As a visible foreign minority, they became the targets of discrimination as their numbers grew. When Sonora began officially tracking foreign residents in 1890, there were only 229 Chinese in Sonora, but by 1910 there were nearly 4,500, a third of all Chinese in Mexico. They formed working relationships with other groups in Sonora, including the working class, local Mexican estate owners, and investors from the U.S. Their enterprises were almost uniformly small-scale and employed only fellow Chinese. With the development of the copper mining settlement and boom town of Cananea, Chinese created the largest of its Sonoran settlements there. The influx of mine workers needed supplies, which Chinese businesses sold. A number of Chinese also entered truck farming of vegetables for local markets, enterprises that did not conflict with the larger scale estates producing cereals, with some haciendas leasing them land not suitable for cereal cultivation. As the presence in the Sonoran economy increased, many Mexicans saw them as a threat as outsiders. The Díaz government facilitated Chinese immigration as part of its larger strategy of economic development that encouraged new business enterprises of foreigners. The platform of Liberal Party of Mexico platform of 1906 had anti-Chinese articles, including banning Chinese immigration.

== In historical memory ==
Although the Sonorans played a decisive role in the Constitutionalist faction winning the Revolution, they have not been the subject of the kind of revolutionary hagiography of Villa or Emiliano Zapata. So far there has not been a major study of the Sonorans, although there have been individual biographies in English of Obregón and Calles. The revolutionary achievements of Obregón and Calles have been overshadowed by historians' focus on Lázaro Cárdenas's presidency (1934–1940). Mexican historian Héctor Aguilar Camín has portrayed the Sonorans as "brutal strangers who conquered a nation to which they remained alien ... anticlerical and creole frontiersmen who overwhelmed a Catholic, indigenous and mestizo old Mexico." Calles's remains now rest in the Monument to the Revolution in central Mexico City, but Obregón's do not. A huge Obregón monument was built on the spot in the San Angel neighborhood of Mexico City where he was assassinated and for decades held the preserved arm he lost in a victorious against Villa, while his body was buried in Huatabompo. De la Huerta rebelled in 1923, when Obregón passed over him to designate Calles as his successor. He has been largely seen as a largely unimportant figure of the Sonorans, but recent research has somewhat lifted his obscurity in the historical literature. Obregón's maternal cousin, Benjamín Hill, has also not been spotlighted for his contributions, but he "played a crucial role as one of the principal generals in the Sonoran theater" and organized the Liberal Constitutionalist Party for the 1920 elections. He was called "Obregón's lost right arm," alluding to the arm his cousin lost in the 1915 battle, defeating Villa. He held the post of Secretary of War in the Obregón cabinet, but died under mysterious circumstances quite soon after. Calles viewed Hill as a rival and was immediately blamed for the "feast of the Borgias" in which Hill died.

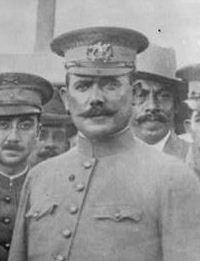
General Álvaro Obregón

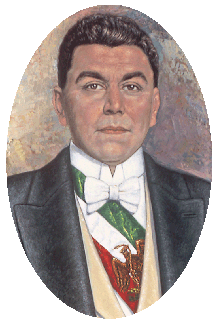
Adolfo de la Huerta

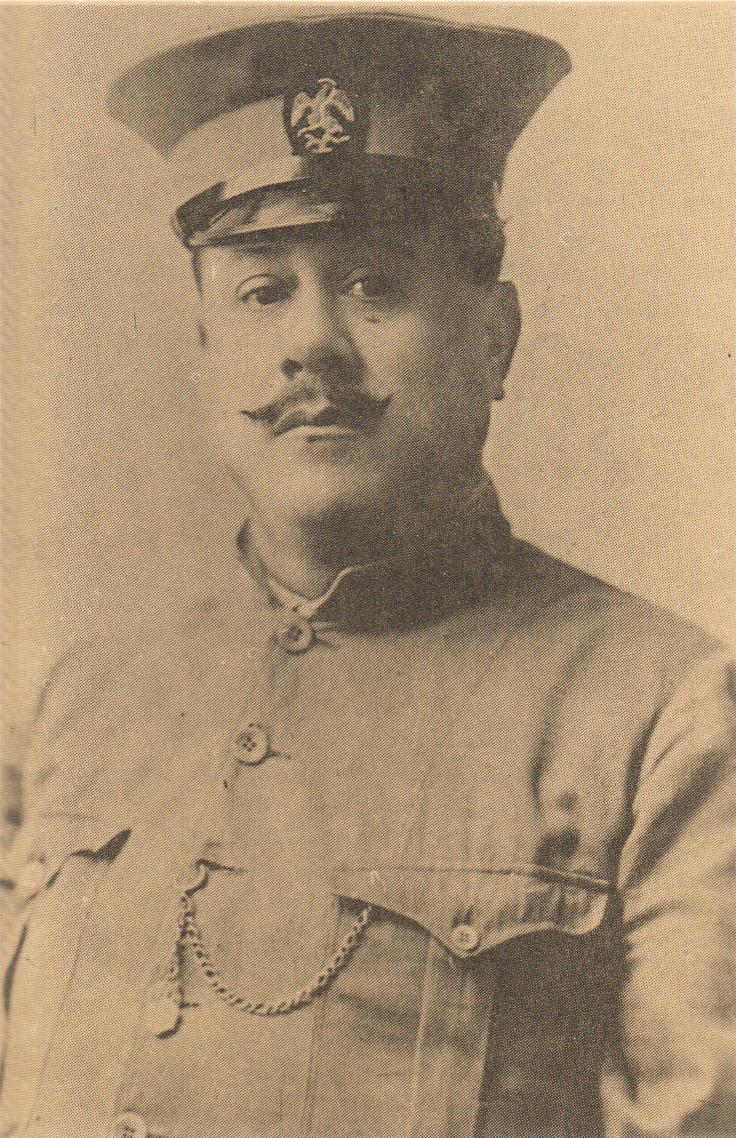
Benjamín Hill, Alvaro Obregón's maternal cousin

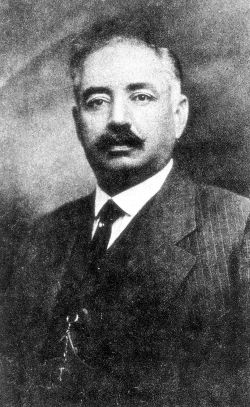
José María Maytorena

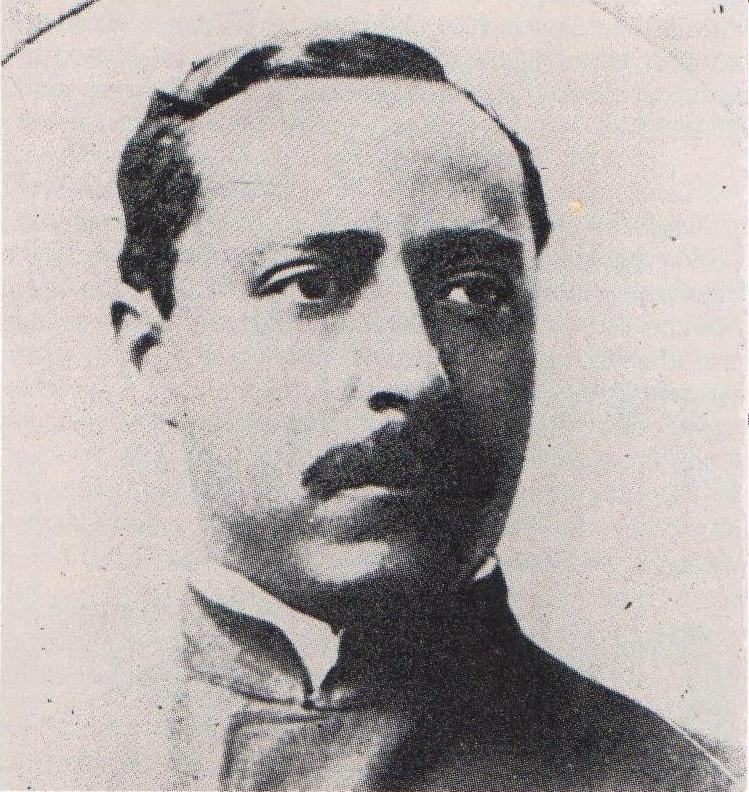
Juan G. Cabral

== See also ==
- Mexican Border War (1910–1919)
- Mexican Revolution
