= Battle of Naco =

- Part of the Mexican Revolution
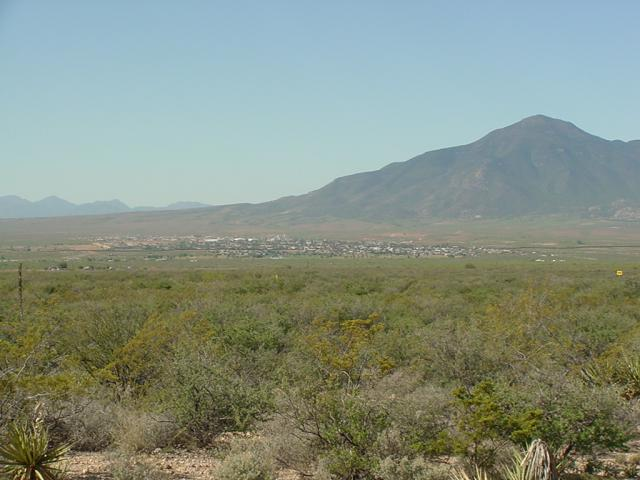
- Naco in 2008, from a distance.
Date	April 8–13, 1913
Location	Naco, Sonora, Mexico
Result	Constitutionalist victory, rebels capture Naco.

Belligerents
Constitutionalists: Constitutional Army	Government: Federal Army

Commanders and leaders
Alvaro Obregon	Pedro Ojeda

Strength
Unknown	~300 infantry

Casualties and losses
Unknown	~30 killed 58 wounded

The Battle of Naco, or the First Battle of Naco due to a later siege was a battle of the Mexican Revolution between Constitutionalist forces and Mexican government forces. Rebel forces under General Alvaro Obregon defeated the Mexican Army garrison and captured Naco, Sonora.

== Background ==
During the Mexican Revolution, Naco was a heavily contested battleground. The border town was prosperous and its assets were highly valued by all forces during the revolution. On March 12, 1913, the federal Mexican General Pedro Ojeda evacuated Agua Prieta due to an advancing and overwhelming rebel army. His force included about 500 men, over 300 of whom were regular army troops, the remaining were Yaqui native Americans, fighting for the Mexican government. The size of Obregon's army is unknown. Twice General Ojeda left Agua Prieta to attack rebel forces advancing to attack his garrison, he defeated two columns on March 15 and 20. On March 17, over 100 Yaquis and their families deserted and surrendered to the United States Army stationed along the border, over 100 more deserted within the following days.

== Battle ==
General Obregon attacked Naco from the southwest on April 8, 1913; only the 300 federal troops remained to defend the town. First skirmishing occurred at the outskirts of town for a few days. Gradually the stronger rebel force gained ground from the federals. When the rebels reached Ojeda's strong point, they attacked repeatedly without full force and were repulsed several times by federal forces. On April 10, General Ojeda defeated a large attack by Obregon's army, but this only led to Obregon's strengthening of his assaults. Finally on April 13, General Obregon launched a massive assault with most of his force on Ojeda's remaining men. The Naco garrison was unable to hold out so they retreated and escaped across the border into the Arizona desert to the north. Obregon took control of Naco; Ojeda along with his men, surrendered to the United States Cavalry garrison of Fort Huachuca. The United States cavalry which accepted Ojeda's surrender reported that 213 Yaquis surrender to them, thirty of whom were wounded in battles that took place before the Naco engagement. A total of 260 federal Mexican troops surrendered to the American cavalry, fifty-six federals were wounded at Naco and about 30 more troops died at the battle. Rebel casualties are unknown. On April 18, 1913, Ojeda, his men, and the Yaquis were released from United States custody and went back to Mexico.

== Second Battle ==
Naco would become a battlefield again during the Mexican Revolution. The famous Siege of Naco in late 1914 and early 1915 became the longest battle of the war with 119 consecutive days of combat. The battle was fought between Villistas under Jose Maria Maytorena against General Obregon's garrison of Naco.

== See also ==
- Mexican Expedition
