= Roque Estrada Reynoso =

Mexican judge (1883–1966)

Roque Estrada Reynoso (August 16, 1883 – November 27, 1966) was a Mexican lawyer, journalist, and writer. The brother of general Enrique Estrada, he served in the army during the Mexican Revolution and ran for president against Álvaro Obregón in 1920. After being exiled to the United States in the 1920s, he returned and became a member of the Institutional Revolutionary Party, serving as its press secretary in 1935. He was named to the Supreme Court of Justice of the Nation in 1941 and served as chief justice in 1952, retiring from the court in 1953. He was awarded the Belisario Domínguez Medal of Honor, the highest decoration conferred by the Senate of the Republic, in 1957.

== Life ==
Born in Moyahua, Zacatecas, on August 16, 1883. His parents were José Camilo Estrada Haro and Micaela Reynoso Espitia. His younger brother was Enrique Estrada. He organized workers in a socialist party in Guadalajara in 1904. He completed his law degree at the University of Guadalajara in 1906. He participated in the presidential campaign of Francisco I. Madero in 1909, as a Member of the Anti-Reelectionist Party. He was jailed with Francisco I. Madero in San Luis Potosí in 1909. Later, he became the provisional Secretary to Francisco I. Madero in 1910, when he returned to Mexico. He was also the Private Secretary to Venustiano Carranza in 1914. He was appointed the Commanding Officer of the 2nd Cavalry Brigade, Western Division from 1914 to 1915, and he obtained the rank of Brigadier General. He was Provisional Governor of Aguascalientes in 1915. From 1915 to 1916, he was named Secretary of Justice. He was candidate for president of Mexico against General Álvaro Obregón, in 1920.

He was a federal deputy from the State of Zacatecas, 1920-22. He joined his brother Enrique Estrada in 1923 in support of the Adolfo de la Huerta rebellion. As a result, he was in exiled to the United States in 1923 and 1927-29. He was the Secretary of Press and Publicity of the national organization of the Institutional Revolutionary Party (Spanish: Partido Revolucionario Institucional or PRI), June 19, 1935. In 1942 he was judge and then president of the Supreme Court of Justice of the Nation (Suprema Corte de Justicia de la Nación), in 1952. In 1957, the Senate of the Republic honored Estrada with the Belisario Domínguez Medal of Honor, its highest award. He died in Mexico City on November 27, 1966.

== Chief Justices Supreme Court of Justice of the Nation ==
Chief Justice (Suprema Corte de Justicia de la Nación) under the 1917 Constitution:

- 1941–1951: Salvador Urbina
- 1952: Roque Estrada Reynoso
- 1953: Hilario Medina

== Books ==
- La Revolución y Francisco I. Madero. Primero, segunda y tercera etapas. Guadalajara: Imprenta americana, Marzo de 1912.
- Momento psicologico. Mexico, 1914. (Written during March and April, 1914, while in prison in Mexico.--cf. p. 62.)
- Tema desarrollado en el teatro : arbeu, la noche del 22 de Mayo de 1916, en la velada con motivo de la repartición de socorros a los heridos en campaña: nuestros problemas. México: Andrés Botas, 1916
- Concentración antibolchevique. México: Imprenta I. Escalante, 1923.
- ... Liberación, novela histórica-contemporánea. Portada de Ernesto García Cabral. México: Editorial "Cvltvra", 1933. (A series of articles originally appearing in Excelsior, Dec. 18-19, 1922 and Jan. 2-29, 1923)
- ... Idiota, novela. México: Ediciones Botas, 1935.

== Sources ==
- Estrada Reynoso, Roque. In: Mexican Political Biographies, 1935-1993. By Roderic Ai Camp, Austin: University of Texas Press, 1995: 223-224.
- Estrada Reynoso, Roque. In: Historical dictionary of Mexico. By Donald C. Briggs, Marvin Álisky, Metuchen, N.J.: Scarecrow Press, 1981: 77.
