= Laborist Party (Mexico) =

Defunct Mexican political party

Mexican Laborist Party Partido Laborista Mexicano
- Presidents: Álvaro Obregón (1919–1924); Plutarco Elías Calles (1924–1929)
- Founder: Luis Napoleón Morones
- Founded: 21 December 1919
- Dissolved: c. 1941
- Headquarters: Mexico City
- Newspaper: El Sol
- Trade union wing: Regional Confederation of Mexican Workers (until 1928)
- Ideology: Social democracy Democratic socialism Laborism; Workers' self-management
- Political position: Centre-left to left-wing
- Colours: Red; Black

The Mexican Laborist Party (Spanish: Partido Laborista Mexicano, PLM), also translated as the Mexican Labor Party, was a social democratic political party in Mexico that existed from 1919 until the early 1940s.

The PLM was founded by Luis Napoleón Morones, one of Mexico's main union leaders. The PLM functioned as the political branch of the Regional Confederation of Mexican Workers (CROM), the country's most powerful union. The party gave a platform to a particular portion of Mexico's social base and was in opposition to the Constitutionalist Party.

In the 1920s the PLM was the most powerful party in Mexico. Presidents Álvaro Obregón (1920–1924) and Plutarco Elías Calles (1924–1928) were elected on a PL ticket and in 1922 the PL managed to defeat the Liberal Constitutionalist Party in congressional elections, becoming largest party in the Congress of Mexico. Competition with rival parties, including the PLC, the National Cooperativist Party (PNC), the Mexican Communist Party (PCM), the National Agrarian Party (PNA), and the National Anti-Reelectionist Party (PNA) was often violent, with the government usually supporting the PL.

After the assassination of Obregón, who was recently elected, in 1928 the party's power started to decline. Morones was suspected to benefit from Obregón's death and lost support. In 1929, Calles founded the National Revolutionary Party (PNR), which became the new ruling party and absorbed much of the cadres and leadership of the PL.

No longer endorsed by the Mexican political elite, the Laborist Party fell into irrelevance. It last participated in the election in 1940, when it supported the centre-right candidate Juan Andreu, and disappeared entirely soon after.
