= Enrique Estrada =

Mexican politician (1890–1942)

Enrique Estrada Reynoso (1890–1942) was a Mexican General, politician, and Secretary of National Defense.

Born in Moyahua, Zacatecas in 1890. His parents were José Camilo Estrada Haro and Micaela Reynoso Espitia. His older brother was Roque Estrada Reynoso.

As a student at the School of Engineering of the capital, he was one of the students antirreeleccionistas resistance that led to the President of the Republic, General Porfirio Díaz, a statement in which he called for the resignation of his office.

On the occasion of the danger to which he explained the previous event, had to leave the city and marched and joined the revolution under General Rafael Tapia in 1910.

The triumph of the revolutionary movement in timber, resumed his studies at the Engineering School and he was taught classes in artillery by General Felipe Ángeles. During the Decena trágica, he defended the legitimate government of Francisco I. Madero.

In the year 1913, chose to leave the south of Zacatecas, in the same year, operated in conjunction with the forces of General Lucio Blanco, who then belonged, under the Army Corps Northwest commanded of General Álvaro Obregón.

He was the governor of Zacatecas and Sinaloa in 1922.

Among the positions he played outstanding highlights: Chief of Military Operations Campaign Yaqui, Governor and Military Commander of the State of Zacatecas; Chief of the Military Operations of the states of Michoacán, Colima, Jalisco, Zacatecas, Aguascalientes and Guanajuato, Assistant Secretary and Secretary of War and Navy, from December 14, 1920 to March 4, 1922. He was the Chief of Military Operations in Michoacán and Colima in 1923.

== Delahuertista rebellion ==
In 1923, Amaro's chief of staff José Álvarez learned of the plot between generals Enrique Estrada, Guadalupe Sánchez, and Fortunato Maycotte to overthrow President Álvaro Obregón. Álvarez immediately returned to Nuevo León and informed Amaro of the plot, who promptly related the information to Obregón. The conspirators drafted Adolfo de la Huerta, then-Minister of Finance, to run for president against Plutarco Elías Calles, Obregón's chosen successor. Facing a rebellion with armies in the North, South, and East, Obregón relied on loyal generals such as Amaro to block rebel access to resources and the northern border and to put down the insurrection. Amaro, aided by General Lázaro Cárdenas, battled Estrada's forces, defeating them in the decisive battle of Ocotlán. Three days after the battle, Amaro's troops occupied Guadalajara, where Estrada's operation had been based. The rebellion crushed, the 1924 Mexican election was carried out peacefully.

He was arrested in 1926 by the FBI under the leadership of by Special Agent Edwin Atherton while heading a large convoy of armored vehicles and armed men east of San Diego, California, and jailed in the United States for 21 months. Atherton had been alerted by an informant and a Mexican official in "lower California."

He supported the Escobar Rebellion in 1929, and captured the future president of Mexico, Manuel Ávila Camacho, but allowed him to go free.

General Estrada Reynoso died on November 3, 1942, when the post of General Manager of Ferrocarriles Nacionales de México.

The city of General Enrique Estrada, in the state of Zacatecas is named after him.

== Offices ==
Preceded by Benjamín Hill	Secretary of National Defense; 1920—1922	Succeeded by Francisco R. Serrano

== Sources ==
Estrada Reynoso, Enrique. In: Mexican Political Biographies, 1935-1993. By Roderic Ai Camp, Austin: University of Texas Press, 1995: 223.
