= Plan of Agua Prieta =

1920 declaration of rebellion against Mexican president Venustiano Carranza

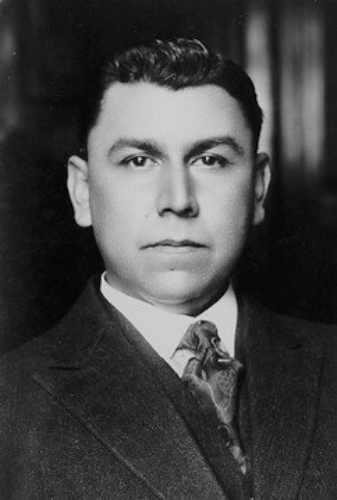
Adolfo de la Huerta

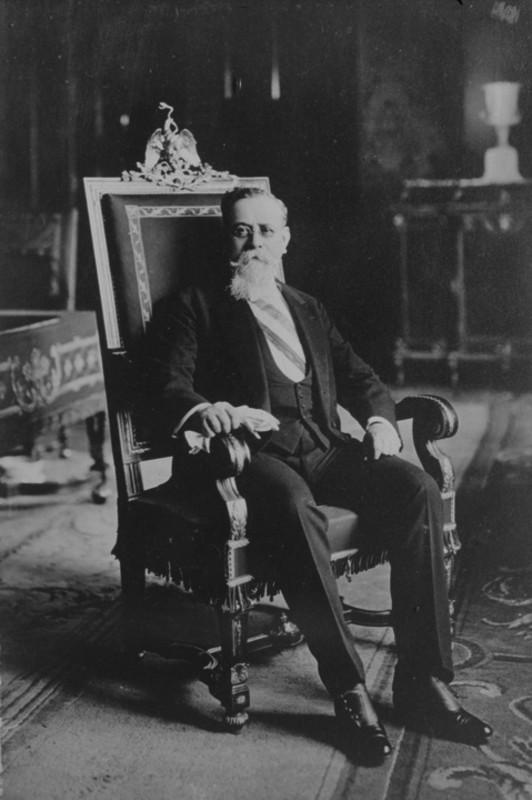
President Venustiano Carranza

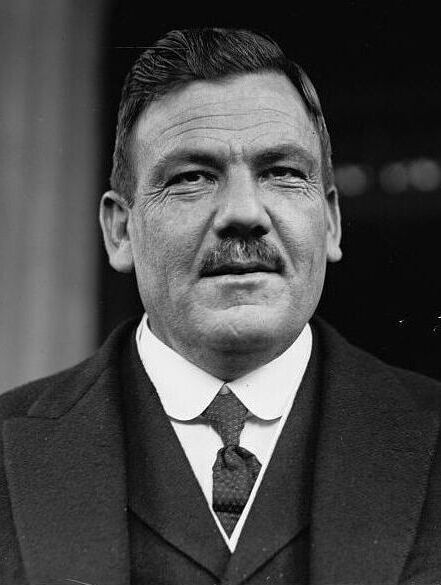
Plutarco Elías Calles

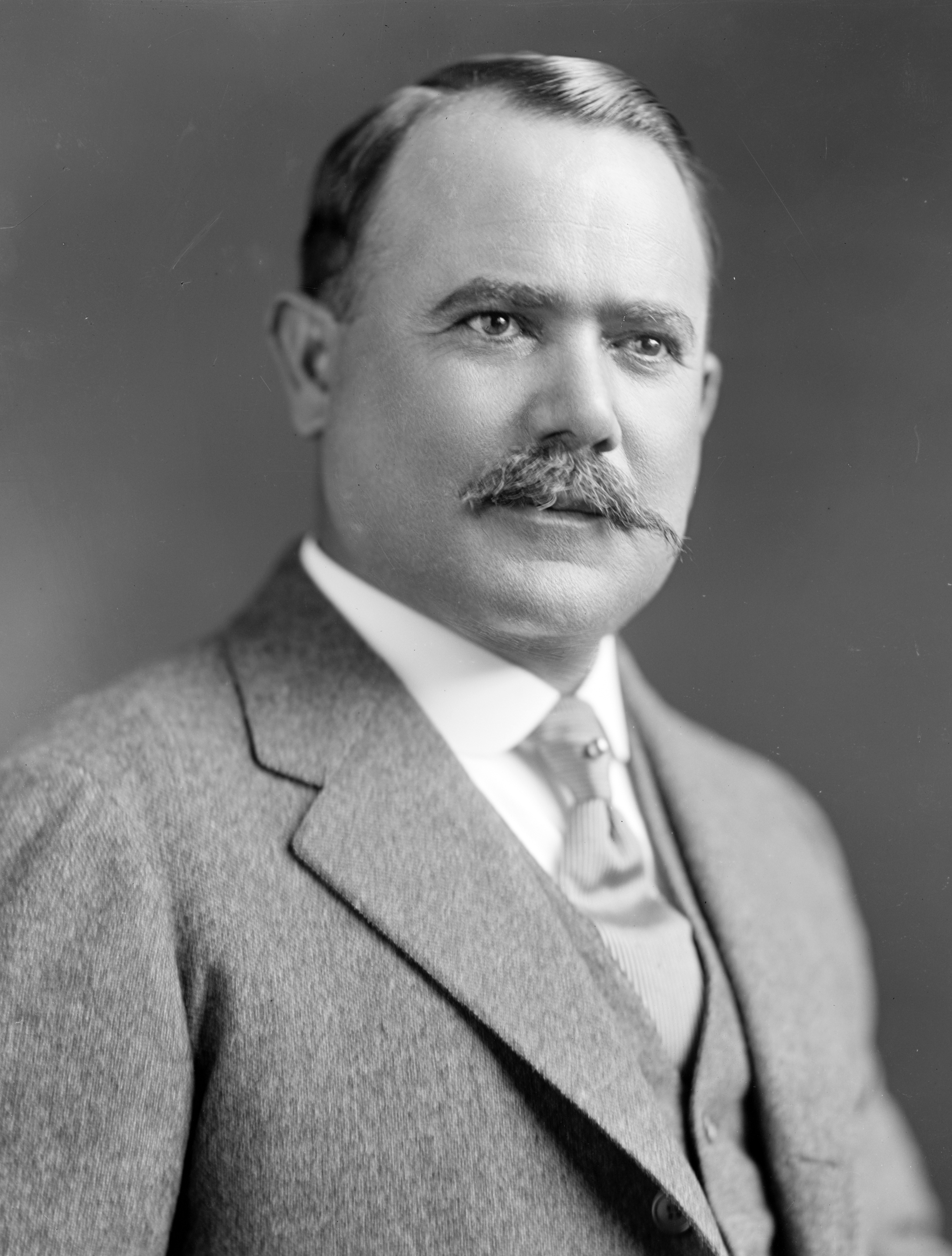
Alvaro Obregón

In the history of Mexico, the Plan of Agua Prieta (Spanish: Plan de Agua Prieta) was a manifesto, or plan, that articulated the reasons for rebellion against the government of Venustiano Carranza. Three revolutionary generals from Sonora, Álvaro Obregón, Plutarco Elías Calles, and Adolfo de la Huerta, often called the Sonoran Triumvirate, or the Sonoran Dynasty, rose in revolt against the civilian government of Carranza. It was proclaimed by Obregón on 22 April 1920, in English and 23 April in Spanish in the northern border city of Agua Prieta, Sonora.

The Plan's stated pretext for rejecting the Carranza administration was a dispute between the federal government and the Sonora state government over control of the waters of the Sonora river, although the underlying reasons were complex. Carranza and the revolutionary generals who controlled the state of Sonora were increasingly in conflict. Carranza's most successful general, Obregón, had retired from Carranza's cabinet, returning to Sonora to run his prosperous farm, but had political ambitions to run for president in the 1920 elections. He received no encouragement from Carranza, and announced his candidacy which included a disparaging assessment of Carranza. Carranza sought a candidate from Sonora to back instead. The state governor, Adolfo de la Huerta, was not interested. Carranza chose Ignacio Bonillas, a civilian who served as Mexico's ambassador to the U.S. Although Bonillas was a skilled diplomat and the relationship with the U.S. was crucial, Bonillas was a virtual unknown in revolutionary Mexico. He did not have a military record in the Mexican Revolution, and critics saw the choice as a way that Carranza could continue to wield power even though no longer president of Mexico.

Carranza was in the process of centralizing power and saw Sonora as too independent of central government control and moved to curtail its autonomy. Such a move, coupled with his attempt to impose a civilian as his successor, aroused the ire of revolutionary generals. They saw Carranza's maneuvering as trying to outflank the men who had won the Mexican Revolution and were not willing to allow a civilian nobody to come to power in 1920. The Plan of Agua Prieta outlined a series of charges against the Carranza regime, to articulate their grievances in written form to be distributed and to rally others to join their cause. De la Huerta, Calles and Salvador Alvarado were the key authors of the plan. The rebellion in Sonora predated the Plan by a few days. The rebellion was joined by the governor of Michoacan, General Pascual Ortiz Rubio, and the governor of Zacatecas, General Enrique Estrada. Signing on to the Plan, once it was issued, were Luis L. León, General Ángel Flores, General Francisco R. Manzo, General Francisco R. Serrano, and Col. Abelardo L. Rodríguez, later to become President of Mexico.

Sonora withdrew its support from Carranza's federal government; the plan also refused to recognize the results of local elections in the states of Guanajuato, San Luis Potosí, Nuevo León, Querétaro, and Tamaulipas, and the governor of the state of Nayarit. It offered to refrain from entering into combat with the authorities, provided that they refrained from attacking the Liberal Constitutionalist Army, headed by Adolfo de la Huerta, at the time governor of Sonora. Others joined as well, including Lázaro Cárdenas of Michoacan, who had served under Calles in the Revolution, and held a command in Veracruz state at the time. Only after the plan was issued did Obregón sign on to it.

The plan empowered De la Huerta to appoint interim governors in those states that aligned with or were defeated by the Liberal Constitutionalist Army. It called on the state governments to appoint representatives to a junta, which would then select an interim President of the Republic. The interim president would, immediately upon assuming office, call a fresh general election.

Support for the Plan was widespread across the country: more than three-quarters of the Army rejected Carranza and joined the rebellion. As De la Huerta's Liberal Constitutionalist Army made rapid progress toward Mexico City, Carranza refused to negotiate or surrender and fled the capital by train in May 1920, headed for the port of Veracruz, where he intended to set up a temporary seat of government as he had earlier during the Revolution. The train was attacked repeatedly as it left the capital and, arriving at Aljibes, Puebla, was unable to continue because of sabotage to the tracks. In addition, Carranza then learned that the military commander of Veracruz, Gen. Guadalupe Sánchez, had gone over to the rebels.

Carranza and a small group of followers were forced to change plans: they would head north on horseback, perhaps to Carranza's home state of Coahuila, where his support might be stronger. On horseback they began a crossing of the Sierra Norte, and, on 20 May, reached the town of Tlaxcalantongo, Puebla. A rebel ambush in the early hours of 21 May 1920, reputedly led by Gen. Rodolfo Herrero, left President Carranza dead, either assassinated by the rebels or by suicide. Carranza's deposition is considered the last coup d'état in Mexican history.

Adolfo de la Huerta was appointed interim president. He served from 1 June to 30 November 1920, and was succeeded by Álvaro Obregón, who was elected the constitutional president in September 1920.

== See also ==
- Mexican Revolution
- Plans in Mexican History
