= Constitutional Army =

- Ejército Constitucionalista
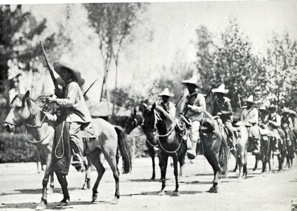
- Entrance of the constitutional cavalry to the Paseo de la Reforma.
- Active: 1913–1920
- Disbanded: 1920
- Nickname: Carrancistas
- Engagements: Mexican Revolution; Border War

Commanders
- Notable commanders: Venustiano Carranza; Álvaro Obregón

Insignia
- Flag

The Constitutional Army (Spanish: Ejército constitucional), also known as the Constitutionalist Army (Spanish: Ejército constitucionalista), was the army that fought against the Federal Army, and later, against the Villistas and Zapatistas during the Mexican Revolution. It was formed in March 1913 by Venustiano Carranza, so-called "First-Chief" of the army, as a response to the murder of President Francisco I. Madero and Vice President José María Pino Suárez by Victoriano Huerta during La Decena Trágica (Ten Tragic Days) of 1913, and the resulting usurpation of presidential power by Huerta.

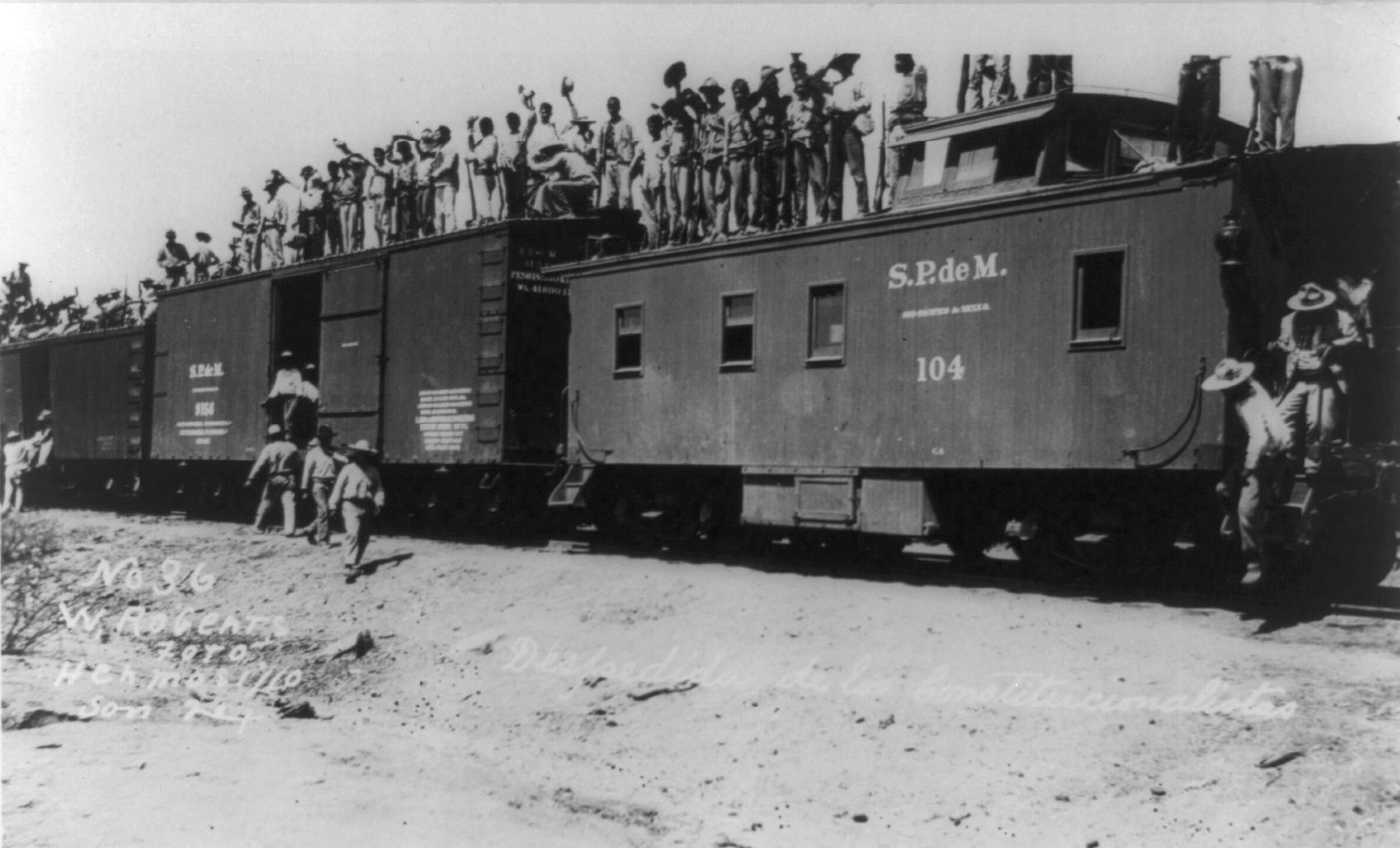
Written on this photo taken between 1911 and 1914 is "despedido de los constitucionalistas" (farewell of the constitutionalists) of soldiers standing on top of S.P. de M. railroad cars during the Mexican revolution.

Carranza had a few military forces on which he could rely for loyalty. He had the theoretical support of Pancho Villa and Emiliano Zapata, but they soon turned against the Constitutionalists after Huerta's defeat in 1914.

In July 1913, Carranza divided the country into seven areas for military operations. Each area was, at least in theory, the responsibility of a general commanding an Army corps. These corps were: Northeast, Northwest, Central, East, West, South and Southeast. However the last four existed only on paper and in reality the Constitutionalist army was made up of only the Northwest Corps (renamed the Army of Operations) under Álvaro Obregón, the Northeast Corps under Pablo González, and the Central Corps under Pánfilo Natera.

When fighting broke out in 1914 between the Constitutionalists (Carranza, Obregón, etc.) and the Conventionalists (Villa and Zapata) following the Convention of Aguascalientes, the Constitutional Army numbered 57,000 men, to Villa and Zapata's 72,000 men. But as the Constitutionalists grew stronger, Villa and Zapata grew weaker. Eventually the war against the Conventionalists was won after the assassination of Zapata in 1919 and the surrender of Villa in July 1920. By 1917, the main fighting of the civil war between the two factions was over, with some minor revolts by Felicistas (supporters of Félix Díaz, nephew of ousted president Porfirio Díaz). This marked the end of any real resistance to Carranza.

However, when Carranza's autocratic rule was threatened, the threat would come from the Constitutionalist army he had set up. Carranza was assassinated after he tried to have Obregón arrested on false charges (Obregón was put up for election for president, which threatened Carranza and his choice of successor, Ignacio Bonillas) and Obregón, under the Plan of Agua Prieta, marched on Mexico City with his army. Carranza fled the capital and was killed in the Sierra Norte of Puebla on 21 May 1920.

In 1920, Obregón was elected Mexico's president, and some other former Constitutionalist generals would eventually become presidents and leading politicians in the years ahead.

== See also ==
- Mexican Revolution
- Constitutionalists in the Mexican Revolution
- Timeline of Mexican history
