= Ignacio Bonillas =

Mexican diplomat (1858–1942)

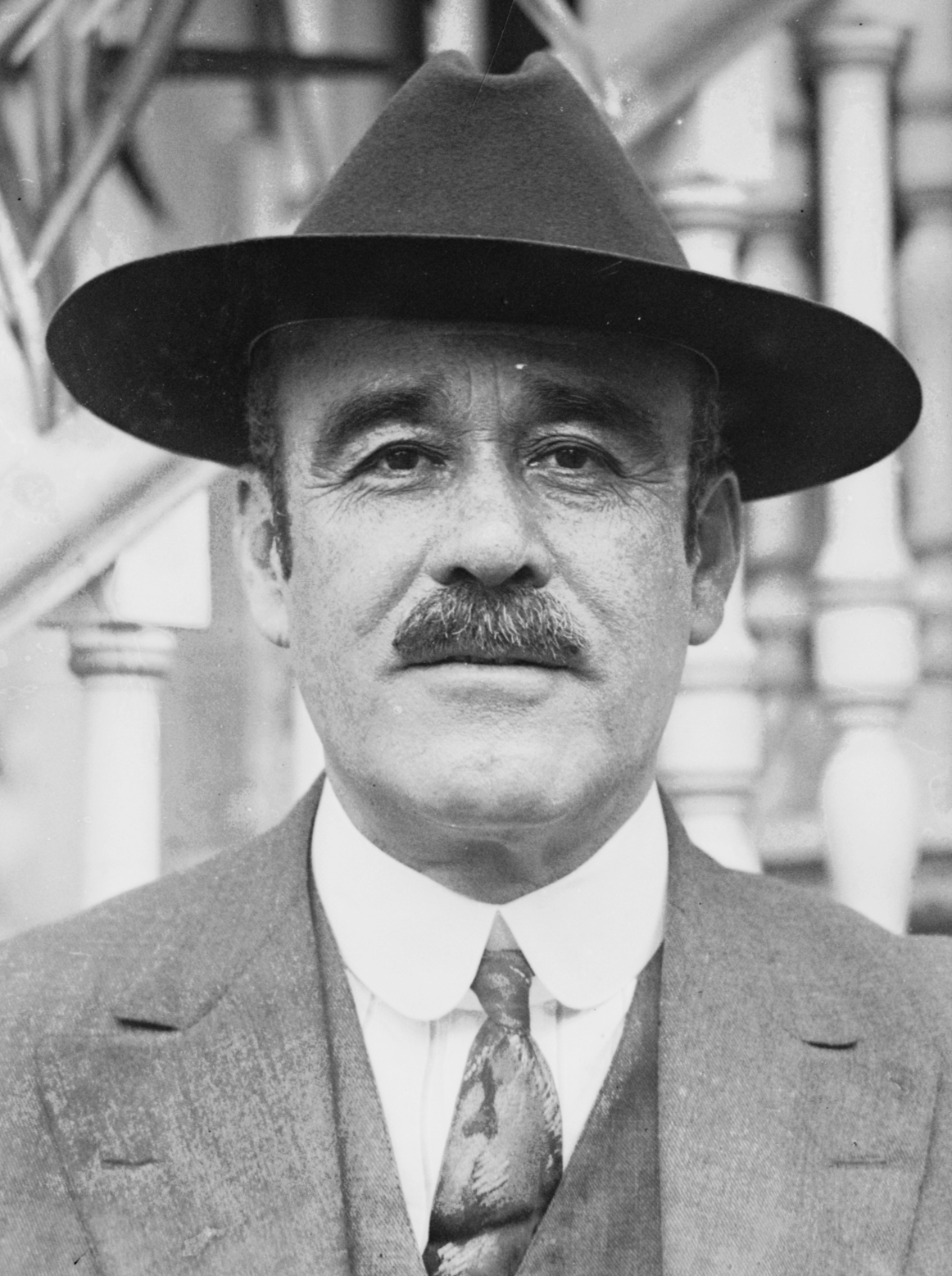
Ignacio Bonillas

Ignacio Bonillas Fraijo (1 February 1858 – 23 June 1942) was a Mexican diplomat. He was a Mexican ambassador to the United States and held a degree in mine engineering from the Massachusetts Institute of Technology. He was tapped by President Venustiano Carranza as his successor in the 1920 presidential elections, but the revolt of three Sonoran revolutionary generals overthrew Carranza before those elections took place.

== Biography ==
He was born on 1 February 1858 in Magdalena de Kino, Sonora, the son of Gervasio Bonillas and Dolores Fraijo. His family moved across the border to the United States to Tucson, Arizona, where he completed his primary studies. He received his degree in civil engineering from Massachusetts Institute of Technology in 1882. Shortly before finishing his degree, he married a woman originally from Boston. Shortly after getting married he returned to Sonora, where the State Government commissioned him along with engineer Charles Herbert to make the outline of the future town of Nogales, in 1884.

Bonillas began to provide services to the state of Sonora in 1890. Bonillas had to make the measurement of the legal estate of Santa Anna and in the same year, he left leading a group of volunteers and defeated in the mountains a party of Apaches who were marauding the area. On 19 March 1900 the state legislature waived the examination so that he could exercise his profession as an engineer, and the Executive issued the corresponding diploma. Bonillas was "long connected with Sonora's mining and contracting companies, trusted by the U.S.-based Southern Pacific Railway."

In 1910 he joined the Anti-reelectionist Party of Francisco I. Madero and shortly after Madero's election following the overthrow of Porfirio Díaz Bonillas was elected Deputy (1911-1913). He was a mining agent in Magdalena, municipal president of Nogales and prefect of the Magdalena District. He was Secretary of Communications in 1912 and did important infrastructure works during the permanence of the constitutionalist government in Veracruz. Following the overthrow of Madero by general Victoriano Huerta, Bonillas joined the Constitutionalist movement headed by Venustiano Carranza. In 1913, Bonillas was part of the war cabinet of the Constitutionalist movement. Carranza's Constitutionalist faction defeated its rivals in 1915 and Carranza became president. On 12 February 1917, Carranza appointed Bonillas Mexican Ambassador to the U.S., the top position for a Mexican diplomat. Bonillas was part of the three member diplomatic delegation responsible of securing the unconditional withdrawal of the U.S. forces of the Punitive Expedition from Mexico that had unsuccessfully sought to capture Pancho Villa following his incursion into Columbus, New Mexico.

Venustiano Carranza, a civilian himself, wanted a civilian instead of a military man to be president of Mexico. Carranza supported the candidacy of Bonillas in the election of 1920, believing that Bonillas's connections in Washington were of supreme importance, even though he was not very well known in Mexico. On 1 November 1919, Carranza announced his support for Bonillas's candidacy. For Sonoran revolutionary generals Adolfo de la Huerta, Alvaro Obregón, and Plutarco Elías Calles, the unknown civilian Bonillas was an unacceptable successor to the presidency, and they staged a revolt under the Plan of Agua Prieta. Carranza, his cabinet, the Supreme Court, and Bonillas fled by train from Mexico City in May 1920. The train was intercepted by rebels. Carranza was murdered, and Bonillas was captured.

Bonillas died on 23 June 1942 in the United States.

== See also ==
- History of Mexico
- Mexican Revolution
- Venustiano Carranza
