= Rodolfo Herrero =

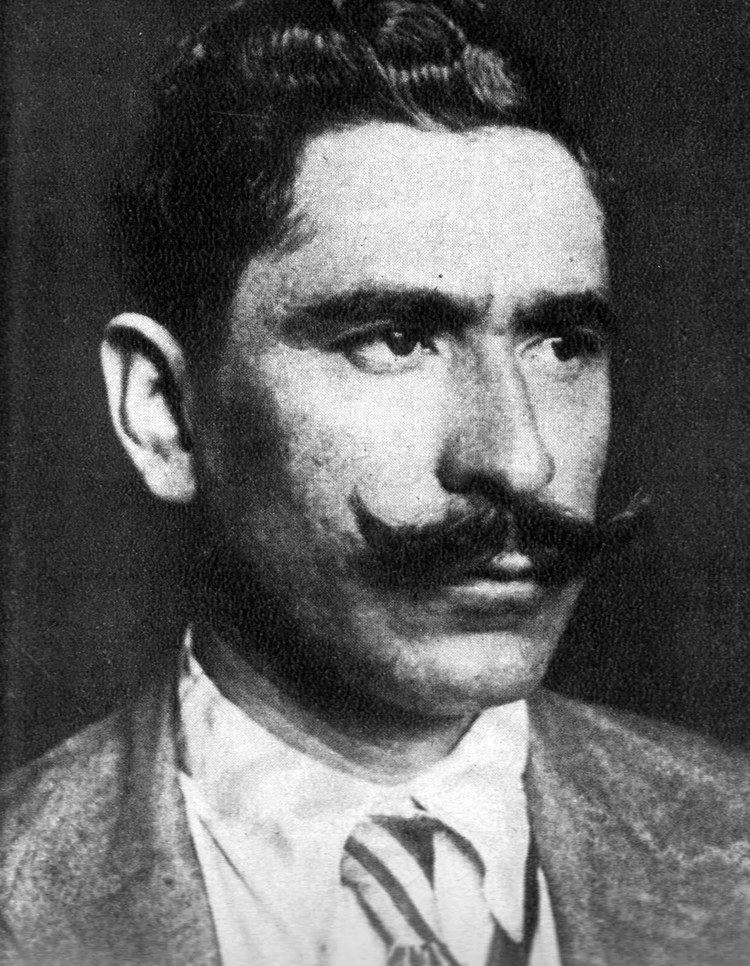
Rodolfo Herrero

Rodolfo Herrero was a Mexican military officer, noteworthy for his participation in the Mexican Revolution of 1910 to 1920. He is generally believed to be the officer responsible for the death of President Venustiano Carranza.

== Biography ==
In early 1920, Herrero was a rebel commander subordinate to General Manuel Peláez. In March 1920, he surrendered to Carranza's forces under the promise of amnesty and was allowed to keep his rank of General.

In May 1920, Carranza's government collapsed under pressure from forces supporting Álvaro Obregón. Carranza and his supporters attempted to flee to Veracruz. At the Aljibes rail station, they were informed that the rail line had been severed and that Veracruz had fallen. Carranza then proposed to travel on foot north to San Luis Potosí. Near the rural village of La Union Carranza's small party was joined by the forces of Rodolfo Herrero. Herrero offered to guide and escort Carranza's party through the rugged rural area of northern Puebla. He escorted the party to the small settlement of Tlaxcalantongo. Herrero then excused himself by saying he had to attend to a wounded brother Hermilo Herrero, but promised to return.

In the early morning of May 21, 1920, Carranza's party was attacked by soldiers believed to be under the command of the Herreros. When the dawn came, Carranza was discovered dead from bullet wounds.

Rodolfo Herrero was ordered to Mexico City for questioning. Obregón denounced him for murder and treason. In the Capital, Herrero was questioned at length, but not held. Seven months later, he was confined for a week in the military prison of Santiago Tlaltelolco. He was stripped of his military rank and cashiered out of the army, but otherwise allowed to go free.

Herrero was subsequently reinstated as a general during the presidency of Obregón, only to be dismissed again during the presidency of Lázaro Cárdenas in 1937. His brother Hermilo Herrero joined forces with Francisco "Pancho" Villa. He slowly moved up the ranks and eventually became a general for the Villa army. He died of natural causes in 1964. He denied that Carranza was murdered. He espoused the alternative theory that Carranza, after being wounded in the leg, had committed suicide, as stated by several eyewitnesses, including Paulino Fontes, Manuel Aguirre, Pedro gil Farias and Ignacio Suarez. This theory presumes that General Basave y Piña never intended to kill Carranza but to capture him.
