= Esther Torres =

Mexican trade unionist (1897–1975)

- Torres, 1916
- Born: Esther Torres Bernal; 27 September 1897; Guanajuato, Mexico
- Died: c. February 1975 (aged 77); Mexico City, Mexico
- Occupation: Seamstress
- Organization: House of the World Worker

Esther Torres Bernal (Note: In this Mexican name, the surname is Torres and the second or maternal family name is Bernal.) (27 September 1897 – c. February 1975) was a Mexican trade unionist of the House of the World Worker (COM). Born in Guanajuato, after completing her primary schooling, she and her family moved to Mexico City, where they worked as seamstresses. During the Mexican Revolution, she joined the COM, organized a seamstresses' union and led a general strike against inflation in 1916. After the strike was suppressed, she was blacklisted and forced into temporary work for many years after, but later received work and a pension from the government of Luis Echeverría Álvarez.

== Biography ==
Esther Torres Bernal was born in Guanajuato on 27 September 1897. Her father, Agapito, was a miner; and her mother, Marcelina, was a muleskinner. She attended primary school, which was a rarity for Mexican girls at the time, until sixth grade, when her father died and she moved together with her family to Mexico City. There she, her mother and sister Ignacia found jobs at a cigar factory, where they worked 12 hour days and in unsafe conditions. They eventually found new jobs at garment workshops, where they worked as seamstresses until the outbreak of civil war in 1914. Torres then joined the House of the World Worker (COM), a syndicalist trade union federation, and founded its seamstresses' union.

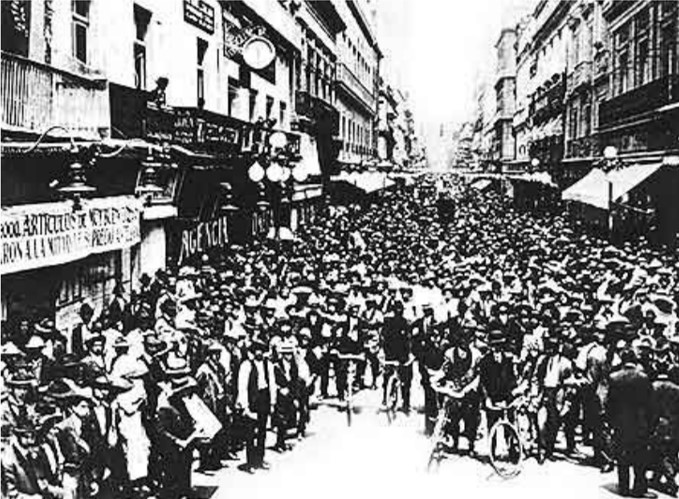
The 1916 general strike in Mexico City

In protest against the rising cost of living, hyperinflation and shortages in Mexico City during the war, Torres formed a strike committee and called a general strike. The main demand of the strike was that workers be paid in gold standard rather than the Constitutionalist government's fiat currency, which they believed would help combat inflation, but the government of Venustiano Carranza refused. The strike involved roughly 90,000 workers and lasted from 31 July to 2 August 1916, during which the economy and infrastructure of Mexico City was paralyzed. On 1 August, Carranza had Torres and the strike committee brought to the National Palace, where he accused them of treason, had them detained and declared martial law to put down the strike.

After the strike ended, Torres was blacklisted by all the textile manufacturers of Mexico City, so she could only find temporary work sewing for friends and acquaintances. She remained active in the COM, within which she met the shoemaker José María Morales (whom she married in 1918), but she was not able to continue her prior work as a union organizer in the decades after the Mexican Revolution. After a museum of the COM was established by Luis Echeverría Álvarez in the 1960s, Torres found work there, giving tours of the sites of the COM during the revolution; she also received a house and a pension from the government during Echeverría's 1970–1976 presidency. Torres died in Mexico City some time after February 1975.

== See also ==
- Juana Belén Gutiérrez de Mendoza – Mexican writer and activist (1875–1942)

== Bibliography ==
Bautista Páez, Diego (2024). "Torres Bernal, Esther". Diccionario biográfico de las izquierdas latinoamericanas (in Spanish).

- Hart, John M. (1978). Anarchism & the Mexican Working Class, 1860–1931. University of Texas Press. doi:10.7560/703315. ISBN 0-292-70400-3.
