= Red Battalions =

The Red Battalions were urban workers who were recruited by the Constitutionalist forces of the Mexican Revolution to fight against the Zapatistas and Pancho Villa's army. The Mexican Revolution was a civil war marked by shifting alliances among factions pursuing different political agendas. The Red Battalions were largely affiliated with the Casa del Obrero Mundial ("House of the World Worker"), an anarcho-syndicalist workers' organization. The battalions were deployed by Venustiano Carranza in exchange for various rights for workers, to defeat the "peasant counterrevolutionaries" of Zapata and Villa. They were called the Red Battalions because of their left-wing membership.

The battalions were ultimately disbanded after Carranza no longer required their forces to subdue the insurgents of the north and the peasant guerrillas of the south. On 13 January 1916, amidst strikes incited by the Casa Obrera Mundial, Carranza ordered the last of the Red Battalions to dissolve. Thereafter all labor unrest was suppressed, often violently, and the Casa went into decline.

== See also ==
- Casa del Obrero Mundial
- Mexican Revolution
