= Casa del Obrero Mundial =

Mexican worker's organization

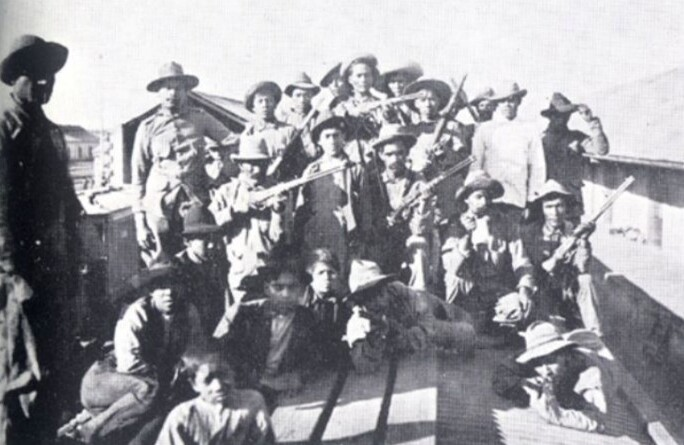

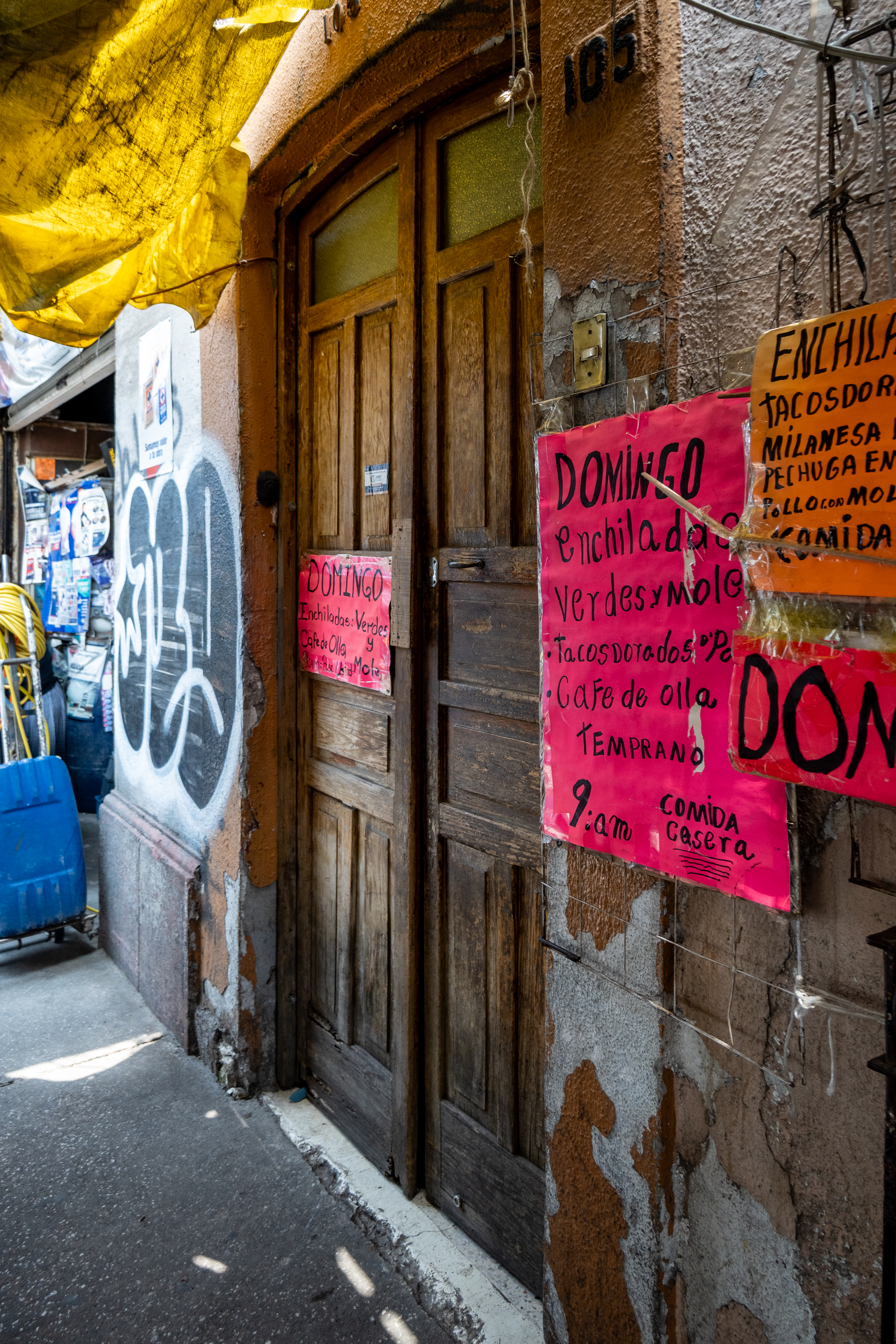
House at 105 Matamoros Street, Tepito. Headquarters of the Casa del Obrero Mundial from 1912 to 1918.

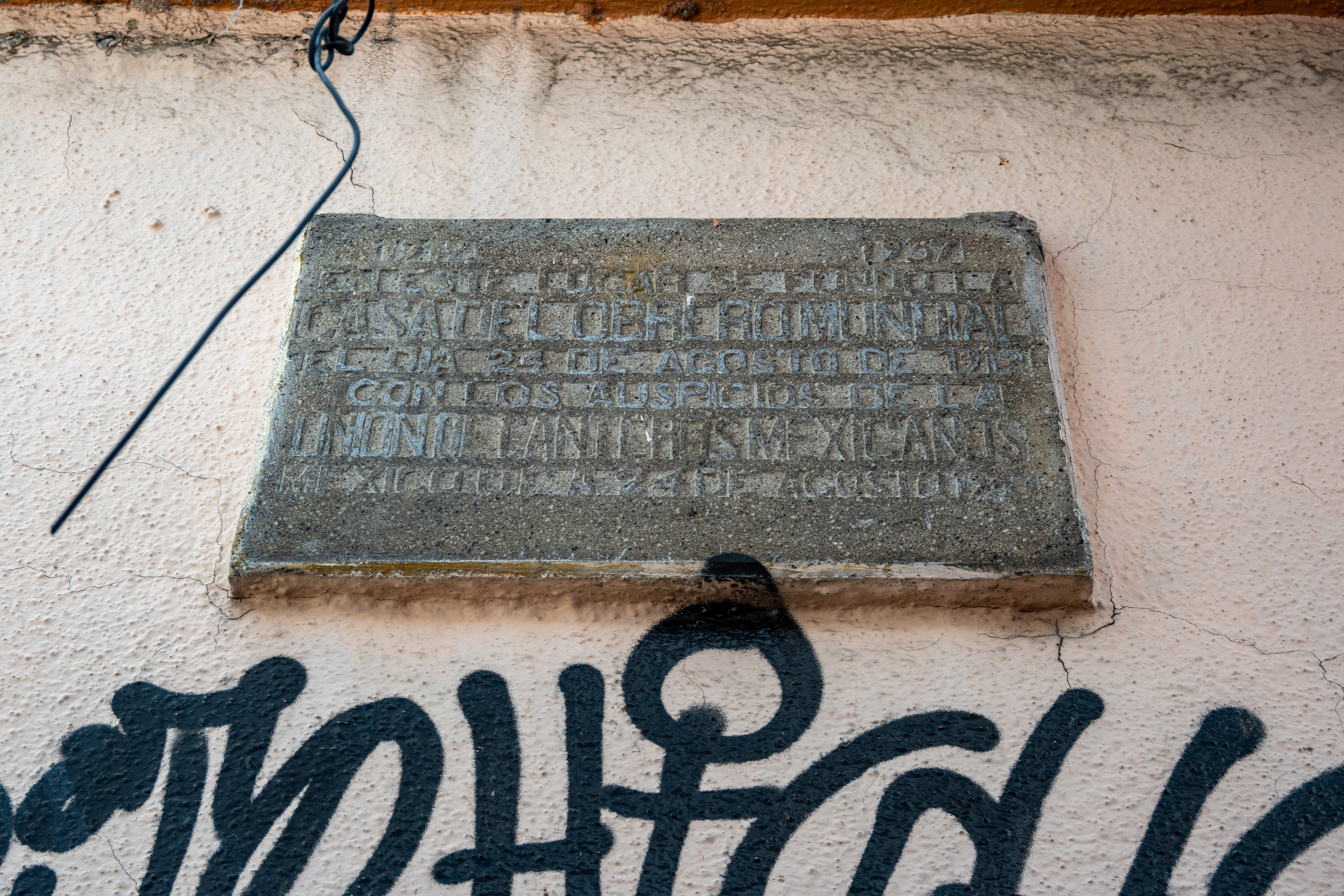
A plaque commemorating the house, donated by the Union of Mexican Stonemasons in 1937.

The Casa del Obrero Mundial (lit. 'House of the World Worker') or COM was a libertarian socialist and anarcho-syndicalist worker's organization located in the popular Tepito Barrio of Mexico City, founded on September 22, 1912. One of its founders was Antonio Díaz Soto y Gama, one of the founders of the Liberal Party of Mexico (PLM) and later a secretary in Emiliano Zapata's army. COM served as a cultural institution promoting worker's education and social transformation through a rationalist, socialist orientation, and as the headquarters for a number of syndicates and unions on a mutual aid basis.

== Formation and the revolution ==
The Casa del Obrero Mundial was founded in the capital in July 1912, during the presidency of Francisco I. Madero; its founders included Antonio Díaz Soto y Gama, Manuel Sarabia, and Lázaro Gutiérrez.

The Casa del Obrero Mundial was at the center of the Mexican labor movement in the early 20th century, and was nourished in part by Spanish anarchosyndicalist exiles of the Confederación Nacional del Trabajo. At the time, the Mexican labor movement was relatively advanced, and though it was not a predominantly industrial economy its non-peasant workers were fairly conscious of popular struggle and their weight in society.

The COM sought abolition of the capitalism and the coordination of worker's syndicates into a confederated socialist economy. In order to do this it engaged in many strikes that struck Mexico before and during the revolution, aiming for its preferred goal of general strike. In a heavily agriculture-based economy, however, its alliance with Mexican campesinos was crucial to its success, but in this aspect it failed, and, through the convoluted situation of the revolution, allied itself with Carranzista forces and formed Red Battalions to fight its supposedly counter-revolutionary enemies, namely the rural-based Zapatistas. The House went into decline following Carranza's increasing suppression of strikes, ultimately pushed out of the labor opposition by labor unions more under government control, such as the CROM. Following the suppression of a general strike on 31 July 1916, the COM was banned on 2 August, with arrest warrants being issued for its leaders. Its regional offices and armories were also seized, and Carranza authorized use of force to arrest other strike participants.

The male leaders of COM who appear on the initials of the pact are as follows Rafael Quintero as General Secretary; Carlos M. Rincón, Leobardo Castro as assistant secretaries; Jesúes Torres Polo as treasurer, and as members: Jorge Barragan Hernández (typographer), Rosendo Salazar (typographer and poet), Jacinto Hutrón (metalworker), Celestino Gasca (originally a shoe worker), Vicente Mendieta (carpenter), Juan Tudó (bricklayer), Roberto Valdes (arms factory mechanic), Salvador Gonzálo García (metalworker), Rodolfo Aguirre (tramway worker), Manuel Herrera Ortiz (electrician), Cresencio Magaña, Manuel Farfán (tailor), Salvador Álvarez (tailor), Adolfo Salgado (shoemaker), Ernesto Méndez (waiter) (Luis Araiza, 1975).

== See also ==
- Red Battalions
- Mexican Liberal Party
- Esther Torres
