= Jesús Carranza =

Mexican colonel

Jesús Carranza Neira (June 16, 1813 – May 25, 1899) was a Mexican mule driver, rancher, and landowner. He was a veteran who fought in the Mexican–Apache Wars, on the side of Benito Juárez and the liberals during the Reform War, and for the republicans against the French intervention in Mexico. He supplied Mariano Escobedo with weapons and horses and provided Juárez himself an interest-free loan in 1866. He was named political chief of Monclova and was repaid with a large land grant in Coahuila after Juárez emerged victorious against the French. A patriarch with 15 children, his second son and eleventh child was Venustiano Carranza, who later became president of Mexico.

== Personal life ==
His paternal grandfather was Juan José Carranza, the town's founder. As a child, he was orphaned by his mother and mistreated by his father's second wife, so he left home at the age of 12 with some Americans who arrived at the transit village for the city of Chihuahua, where they were going, to establish a trading house. Jesús Carranza was married to María de Jesús Garza and had 15 children.

== Legacy ==
The Veracruz town of Jesús Carranza was named in his honor.
