= Manuel Peláez =

Mexican military officer and businessman

- Born: Manuel Peláez Gorrochotegui; 1885
- Died: 1959
- Service years: 1910–1920
- Rank: General

Manuel Peláez Gorrochotegui (1885–1959) was a Mexican military officer, noteworthy for his participation in the Mexican Revolution of 1910 to 1920.

Manuel Peláez was born in 1885 in the Huasteca region of the state of Veracruz, in the coastal area roughly between Tampico, Tamaulipas, and the port of Veracruz. He is primarily known in the Mexican Revolution as an independent general who kept the Carrancista forces at bay between 1915 and 1920. He fought to uphold the local political and economic autonomy of the region, and opposed the central government of Mexico City.

== Initial involvement in the oil business ==
In 1901, oil was discovered in the Huasteca, and several foreign oil companies came into the region of buy or lease subsoil right from the local ranchers. The Peláez family was one of the first families to deal with the oil companies, and Manuel Peláez quickly emerged as a respected and influential broker between the local families and the oil companies. His experiences led him to become a successful businessman, labor contractor, and labor mediator.

== Mexican Revolution and aftermath ==
The 1910 Revolution brought uncertainty to the region, for both the oil companies and the local ranchers. The ranchers decided to join the Francisco Madero revolution hoping to keep economic and political control of the Huasteca away from the central government of Porfirio Díaz. In late 1910, Peláez organized a small local group to fight for Madero. In October 1911, after Díaz was deposed, Peláez was elected mayor of the municipality of Álamo as a supporter of Madero.

He soon became disenchanted with Madero, however, when Madero began demobilizing the local paramilitary forces, and began restricting the operations of the foreign oil companies. He also became disillusioned with Madero because the new government seemed incapable of quelling the banditry and social unrest that followed the revolution. In October 1912, he joined the revolt of conservative Félix Díaz, nephew of Porfirio Díaz. When that revolt was failed, he fled to the United States.

Victoriano Huerta deposed Madero in February 1913, and Peláez returned to the Huasteca in April of the same year. But he found that the area had become inundated with marauding bands calling themselves Constitutionalists. Some time after June 1913, Peláez went to Mexico City and conferred with the Huerta government, asking for assistance in quelling the marauders. The War Department commissioned Peláez a Major in the Home Guard and gave him funds to arm about 500 men. Peláez took to the field again to battle men claiming to support Venustiano Carranza.

In October 1913, Pancho Villa won a major battle over seasoned federal troops and took the city of Torreón, Coahuila. Congress then began to question Huerta's ability to bring peace to the land. Huerta responded by closing congress and arresting 84 congressmen. This caused Peláez to become disillusioned with Huerta, and he decided to follow an independent course, following neither Huerta nor the Carranza revolutionaries.

In late April 1914, U.S. forces took the city of Veracruz, and then in May, Constitutional forces took the city of Tampico. Peláez seeing that the Huerta government would collapse, and fearing he would be taken by the victorious revolutionary forces, fled to the United States. In July of the same year, Huerta fled Mexico when his government collapsed.

Peláez returned to Mexico in October 1914, but found the victorious revolutionaries split into two opposing factions: those who supported the continued leadership of Carranza, and those who supported the new government called the Government of the convention. Greatly disliking Carranza and his followers, he decided to support the Government of the Convention ostensibly headed up by President Eulalio Gutiérrez, but actually controlled by Pancho Villa and Emiliano Zapata. When Pancho Villa suffered a major defeated by Carranza's General Álvaro Obregón in the spring of 1915, the Convention Government collapsed, and Carranza declared himself in control of the Mexico.

== Role as "General" ==
Peláez could not abide Carranza or his plans to bring the oil industry under control of his central government, so he reorganized his irregular forces and took to the field again. Calling himself a General, he imposes taxes on the local oil companies to support a small loyal and well armed rebel force. Between 1915 and 1920, General Peláez and his forces held off several attempts by the Carranza government to control the Huasteca.

In January 1915, two months after Peláez began his rebellion, one of the major oil wells in the Huasteca caught fire, and burned spectacularly for three months. It was unclear what caused the fire, and both sides claimed the fire was due to malicious actions of the other. The prevailing opinion for many years was that Peláez and his forces started the fire when the oil companies refused to pay him money he demanded. Current scholarship now says the oil fire was started by lightning, but exacerbated because the local Carranza commander had closed a water pumping station in retaliation for the oil company not paying a levied fine.

Peláez was a successful strategist who kept Carranza's armies on the defensive for five years. His loosely coordinated but well-paid guerrilla forces never numbered more than 3,000. While he never occupied a major city, his control of the countryside was seldom challenged. The heavily thicketed terrain, the extensive waterways, his access to weapons and ammunitions, and the support of the local population worked to his advantage in launching random surprise attacks on Carranza garrisons, payroll trains, and pipelines. His soldiers intimidated, killed, stole, and set fire to Carrancista garrisons and oil company properties at will, while leaving the Huasteca natives for the most part unharmed. Five Carrancista campaigns between 1917 and 1918 failed to subdue him.

In 1916 and 1917, Félix Díaz attempted to overthrow the government. Both times Peláez offered him financial and moral support, but in 1918, he formally withdrew support from Diaz when it became apparent that Díaz had neither the ability nor the capacity to succeed. Peláez also entered into negotiations with the Zapata movement during 1918 and 1919, but the two sides had only their hatred of Carranza in common, and never reached an agreement.

In October 1919, Peláez had American consular agent William O. Jenkins from Puebla ‘arrested’ to embarrass the Carranza government; demonstrating to the U.S. government that Carranza was unable to police the major cities. Jenkins was released unharmed later the same month, but was immediately arrested by Carranza's police for conspiring to embarrass the government. On September 9, 1919, Peláez, Félix Díaz and Gildardo Magaña, Zapata's successor, issued a joint communiqué to U.S. President Wilson urging his recognition of their belligerencies, in the hope that the United States would somehow internee on their behalf and oppose Carranza, but nothing came of this.

By 1919, Carranza was proving to be ineffective and unpopular. The population favored the accession of Álvaro Obregón for the 1920 election, but Carranza did everything in his power to prevent Obregón's election. In the spring of 1920, Obregón's Sonoran supporters initiated the Agua Prieta Revolt and removed Carranza from power. Peláez agreed to support Obregón's revolt, and when Carranza was attempting to flee to Veracruz, one of Peláez's subordinates caught up to him and killed him. For his support, Obregón rewarded Peláez by having his rank of General confirmed, and he was named Chief of Military Operations in the Huasteca.

== Exile ==
However, in this capacity, he lost his freedom to operate independently, and became accountable to Obregón's military command. Never really seeing eye-to-eye with Obregón, Peláez fell out of favor in the Obregón government, and so he moved to Los Angeles in April 1921. His lieutenants attempted to renew hostilities against the central government but they proved no match for the central government's machinations, and they were all disarmed by the end of 1921.

== Return to Mexico, retirement and death ==
Peláez returned to Mexico in 1923 with intentions of joining the Adolfo de la Huerta rebellion, but he was arrested before he could participate. A few months after the rebellion was crushed, he was released and retired to his Tierra Amarilly ranch, where he lived peacefully until his death in 1959. His family still retains extensive holding in the Huasteca.

== Legacy ==
Peláez is often dismissed as just a tool of the foreign oil companies, but his life is more complex than that. He enjoyed a large measure of genuine local popular support. While the civil war raged on in Mexico, bringing destruction, poverty, and hunger to most parts of the country; the oil-producing Huasteca region remained an enclave of prosperity. Oil operations were constantly expanding, and the oil companies provided their workers with regular pay and supplies of food and other goods, which were easily imported. Oil workers saw themselves as better than the revolutionary bandits, and saw Peláez as a defender of their interests.

== See also ==
- Timeline of Mexican history
