= 1915 in Mexico =

- Decades: 1890s; 1900s; 1910s; 1920s; 1930s
- See also: History of Mexico; List of years in Mexico; Timeline of Mexican history

Events from the year 1915 in Mexico.

== Incumbents ==
=== Federal government ===
- President: Venustiano Carranza
- Secretary of the Interior: Adolfo de la Huerta

=== Governors ===
- Aguascalientes: Aurelio L. González
- Campeche: Joaquín Mucel Acereto
- Chiapas: Manuel Fuentes A./Pablo Villanueva
- Chihuahua: Ignacio C. Enríquez
- Coahuila:
- Colima: Interim Governors
- Durango:
- Guanajuato: Agustín Alcocer
- Hidalgo: Provisional Governors
- Jalisco: Manuel M. Diéguez/Tomás López Linares
- Michoacán: Gertrudis Sánchez/Alfredo Elizondo
- Morelos: Genovevo de la O/Lorenzo Vázquez
- Nuevo León: Ildefonso V. Vázquez/Diódoro de la Garza
- Oaxaca:
- Puebla:
- Querétaro: Teodoro Elizondo/Federico Montes/Gustavo M. Bravo/José Siurob Ramírez
- San Luis Potosí: Juan G. Barragán Rodríguez
- Sinaloa: Ramón F. Iturbe
- Sonora: José María Maytorena/Plutarco Elías Calles
- Tabasco: Joaquín Ruiz/Luis Hernández Hermosillo
- Tamaulipas: Alfredo Ricaut
- Tlaxcala: Alejo González/Máximo Rojas/Porfirio del Castillo
- Veracruz:
- Yucatán: Salvador Alvarado Rubio
- Zacatecas:

== Events ==
- January 22 – Guadalajara train disaster
- April 13 – Battle of Celaya
- August 8 – Norias Ranch Raid
- October 21 – Ojo de Agua Raid
- November 1 – Second Battle of Agua Prieta
- November 26 – Battle of Nogales (1915)

== Births ==
- February 9 – Octavio Sentíes Gómez, 81, politician (PRI), Governor of Veracruz, Secretary of the Interior, Regent of DF (d. May 24, 1996].
- April 4 — Guadalupe Borja de Diaz, First Lady of Mexico (1964-1970) (d. 1974)
- April 21 — Anthony Quinn, Mexican-American actor, painter, writer, and film director (d. 2001)
- April 24 — Salvador Borrego, non-Nazi journalist and writer (d. 2018)

== Deaths ==
- July 2 – Porfirio Díaz, 29th President of Mexico (died in France) (b. 1830)

== See also ==
- Mexican Revolution
