= 1919 in Mexico =

- Decades: 1890s; 1900s; 1910s; 1920s; 1930s
- See also: History of Mexico; List of years in Mexico; Timeline of Mexican history

Events in the year 1919 in Mexico.

== Incumbents ==
=== Federal government ===
- President: Venustiano Carranza

=== Governors ===
- Aguascalientes: Aurelio L. González
- Campeche: Joaquín Mucel Acereto/Enrique Arias Solís
- Chiapas: Pablo Villanueva/Manuel Fuentes A./Pascual Morales Molina
- Chihuahua: Melquiades Angulo/Andrés Ortiz
- Coahuila: Gustavo Espinoza Mireles
- Colima: Interim Governors
- Durango:
- Guanajuato: Agustín Alcocer/Federico Montes
- Guerrero: Francisco Figueroa Mata
- Hidalgo: Nicolás Flores Rubio
- Jalisco: Luis Castellanos y Tapia
- State of Mexico: Joaquín García Luna/Agustín Millán Vivero/Francisco Javier Gaxiola
- Michoacán: Francisco Ortiz Rubio
- Morelos: José G. Aguilar/Benito Tajonar
- Nayarit: Francisco D. Santiago
- Nuevo León: Nicéforo Zambrano/José E. Santos
- Oaxaca: Juan Jiménez Méndez
- Puebla: Alfonso Cabrera Lobato
- Querétaro: Salvador Argain Domínguez
- San Luis Potosí: Juan G. Barragán Rodríguez/Severino Martínez Gómez
- Sinaloa: Ramón F. Iturbe
- Sonora: Plutarco Elías Calles/Adolfo de la Huerta
- Tabasco: Heriberto Jara Corona/Carlos A. Vidal/Carlos Greene Ramírez
- Tamaulipas: Francisco González Villarreal
- Tlaxcala: Máximo Rojas
- Veracruz: Cándido Aguilar Vargas
- Yucatán:
- Zacatecas:

== Events ==
- 10 April: Emiliano Zapata is ambushed and assassinated in Chinameca, Morelos.
- 25 May: Francisco "Pancho" Villa takes the town of Parral, Chihuahua, and hangs the mayor.
- June: Ciudad Juárez, Chihuahua, attacked in Pancho Villa's final raid

== Notable births ==
- 15 March – Piratita Morgan (Raymundo Rodríguez), wrestler (d. 2018)
- 1 April – Antonio Toledo Corro, Governor of Sinaloa 1981–1986 (d. 2018)
- 16 April – Pedro Ramírez Vázquez, architect (Museo Nacional de Antropología).
- 17 May – Antonio Aguilar, singer/actor.
- 29 June – Ernesto Corripio y Ahumada, cardinal (d. 2008)
- 2 October – José Ángel Espinoza, singer-songwriter and actor (d. 2015)
- Date unknown
  - Romeo Gómez Aguilar (97), músician and academic (d. 2019).

== Notable deaths ==
- 10 April – Emiliano Zapata, (39), southern leader of the Mexican Revolution, assassinated (b. 1879)
- 9 November – Virginia Salinas de Carranza, wife of President Venustiano Carranza
- 26 November – Felipe Ángeles, executed after a court-martial.
