= 1920 in Mexico =

- Decades: 1900s; 1910s; 1920s; 1930s; 1940s
- See also: History of Mexico; List of years in Mexico; Timeline of Mexican history

Events in the year 1920 in Mexico.

== Incumbents ==
=== Federal government ===
- President: Venustiano Carranza until May 21, Vacant until June 1, Adolfo de la Huerta until November 30, Álvaro Obregón from December 1
- Secretary of War and Navy: Benjamín G. Hill
- Secretary of the Interior: Gilberto Valenzuela, José Inociencio Lugo, Plutarco Elias Calles from December 1

=== Governors ===
- Aguascalientes: Aurelio L. González/Rafael Arellano Valle
- Campeche: Enrique Arias Solís/Eduardo Arceo Zumárraga/Gonzalo Sales Guerrero
- Chiapas: Pascual Morales Molina/Tiburcio Fernández Ruíz
- Chihuahua: Andrés Ortiz/Ignacio C. Enríquez
- Coahuila: Gustavo Espinoza Mireles
- Colima: Miguel Álvarez García
- Durango:
- Guanajuato: Federico Montes/Toribio Villaseñor/Agustín de Ezcurdia/Antonio Madrazo/Enrique Colunga
- Guerrero: Francisco Figueroa Mata
- Hidalgo: Nicolás Flores Rubio
- Jalisco: Ignacio Ramos Praslow/Francisco Labastida Izquierdo
- State of Mexico: Francisco Javier Gaxiola/Agustín Millán Vivero/Darío López/Abundio Gómez
- Michoacán: Rafael Álvarez/Francisco José Múgica/Celerino Luviano/José Rentería Luviano
- Morelos: Juan María Rodríguez/Luis Flores Martínez/José G. Parres Guerrero
- Nayarit: Francisco D. Santiago/Fernando S. Ibarra/Salvador Arriola Valdés/José Santos Godínez
- Nuevo León: José E. Santos/Humberto Barros/Felix G. Lozano/Porfirio G. González
- Oaxaca: Manuel García Vigil
- Puebla: Alfonso Cabrera Lobato/Rafael Rojas/Luis Sánchez Pontón
- Querétaro: Salvador Argain Domínguez/Fernando N. Villarreal/Rómulo de la Torre/José M. Truchuelo
- San Luis Potosí: Severino Martínez Gómez/Rafael Nieto Compéan
- Sinaloa: Ramón F. Iturbe/Ángel Flores
- Sonora: Adolfo de la Huerta
- Tabasco: Carlos Greene Ramírez
- Tamaulipas: Francisco González Villarreal/Rafael Cárdenas/Emilio Portes Gil/Federico Martínez Rojas/José Morante
- Tlaxcala: Máximo Rojas/Ignacio Mendoza/Octavio Hidalgo/Manuel R. Solís
- Veracruz: Cándido Aguilar Vargas/Adalberto Tejeda Olivares
- Yucatán:
- Zacatecas: Donato Moreno Muro (starting 16 September)

== Events ==
- January 3: The 7.8 M_{s} Veracruz earthquake affected the eastern part of the country with a maximum Mercalli intensity of X–XII. Between 648 and 4,000 were killed and 167 were injured.
- April 23: Mexican Revolution: Plan of Agua Prieta is proclaimed; rebellion against Venustiano Carranza commences.
- May 21: Mexican Revolution: President Venustiano Carranza is assassinated while sleeping in Tlaxcalantongo in the Sierra Norte de Puebla mountains after fleeing Mexico City and heading towards Veracruz.
- June 1: Adolfo de la Huerta becomes provisional president.
- September 5: 1920 Mexican general election: Álvaro Obregón defeats Alfredo Robles Domínguez.
- December 1: Álvaro Obregón becomes president after winning the federal election which brings an end to the Mexican Revolution and has the first stable presidency since the revolution began.

== Popular culture ==
=== Film ===
- Hasta después de la muerte
- El Zarco or Los Plateados

== Notable births ==
- January 14 – Chava Flores, musical chronicler Álbum de Oro de la Canción and composer (Dos horas de balazos and La tertulia) (d. August 5, 1987)
- February 13 – Carlos Quintero Arce, Mexican Roman Catholic prelate, Archbishop of Hermosillo (1968–1996)
- April 20 – José de las Fuentes Rodríguez, lawyer and politician (PRI); Governor of Coahuila 1981–1987 (d. 2011)
- June 16 – José López Portillo, president of Mexico (1970–1976)
- July 29 – Rodolfo Acosta, television actor
- November 25 – Ricardo Montalbán, actor (died 2009)

== Notable deaths ==
- May 21 – President Venustiano Carranza (b. 1859) is assassinated by Rodolfo Herrero.
- June 2 – Francisco Plancarte y Navarrete, archaeologist and archbishop of Monterrey, 1911–1920 (b. 1856)
- December 14 – Gen. Benjamín Hill, Secretary of War, dies in suspicious circumstances. (b. 1877)
