= 1917 in Mexico =

- Decades: 1890s; 1900s; 1910s; 1920s; 1930s
- See also: History of Mexico; List of years in Mexico; Timeline of Mexican history

Events in the year 1917 in Mexico.

== Incumbents ==
=== Federal government ===
- President-Venustiano Carranza

=== Governors ===
- Aguascalientes: Antonio Norzagaray/Aurelio L. González
- Campeche: Joaquín Mucel Acereto
- Chiapas: Manuel Fuentes A./Pablo Villanueva
- Chihuahua: Arnulfo González
- Coahuila: Gustavo Espinoza Mireles
- Colima: Interim Governors
- Durango:
- Guanajuato: Agustín Alcocer
- Guerrero: Francisco Figueroa Mata
- Hidalgo: Nicolás Flores Rubio
- Jalisco: Emiliano Degollado/Manuel Bouquet Jr.
- State of Mexico: Agustín Millán Vivero/Joaquín García Luna
- Michoacán: Alfredo Elizondo/José Rentería Luviano/Pascual Ortiz Rubio
- Morelos:
- Nayarit: José Santos Godínez
- Nuevo León: Nicéforo Zambrano
- Oaxaca: Juan Jiménez Méndez
- Puebla: Alfonso Cabrera Lobato
- Querétaro: Ernesto Perrusquía
- San Luis Potosí: Juan G. Barragán Rodríguez
- Sinaloa: Ramón F. Iturbe
- Sonora: Plutarco Elías Calles
- Tabasco: Joaquín Ruiz/Luis Hernández Hermosillo/Heriberto Jara Corona
- Tamaulipas: Alfredo Ricaut/Andrés Osuna
- Tlaxcala: Antonio M. Machorro/Daniel Ríos Zertuche/Luis M. Hernandez
- Veracruz: Cándido Aguilar Vargas
- Yucatán: Salvador Alvarado Rubio
- Zacatecas:

== Events ==
- January 28 – The United States ends its search for Pancho Villa.
- February 5 – The new and current constitution is adopted.
- February 24 – WWI: United States ambassador to the United Kingdom, Walter H. Page, is shown the intercepted Zimmermann Telegram, in which Germany offers to give the American Southwest back to Mexico if Mexico declares war on the United States.
- March 11 – Venustiano Carranza is elected president of Mexico; the United States gives de jure recognition of his government.
- December 25 – Brite Ranch Raid

== Notable births ==
- February 28 – Ernesto Alonso, Mexican actor, director, cinematographer, and producer (died 2007)
- May 16 – Juan Rulfo, Mexican writer (died 1986)
- August 13 – Rafael Moreno Valle, military physician, politician (PRI), Governor of Puebla (1969-1974) (d. 2016).
- November 18 – Pedro Infante, Mexican actor and singer (died 1957)

== Notable deaths ==
- May 18 — Otilio Montaño Sánchez was a Zapatista general during the Mexican Revolution (b. 1887)
- June 18 — Eufemio Zapata was a member of the Zapatistas during the Mexican Revolution (b. 1873)
- August 9 – José Inés Salazar
