= 1914 in Mexico =

- Decades: 1890s; 1900s; 1910s; 1920s; 1930s
- See also: History of Mexico; List of years in Mexico; Timeline of Mexican history

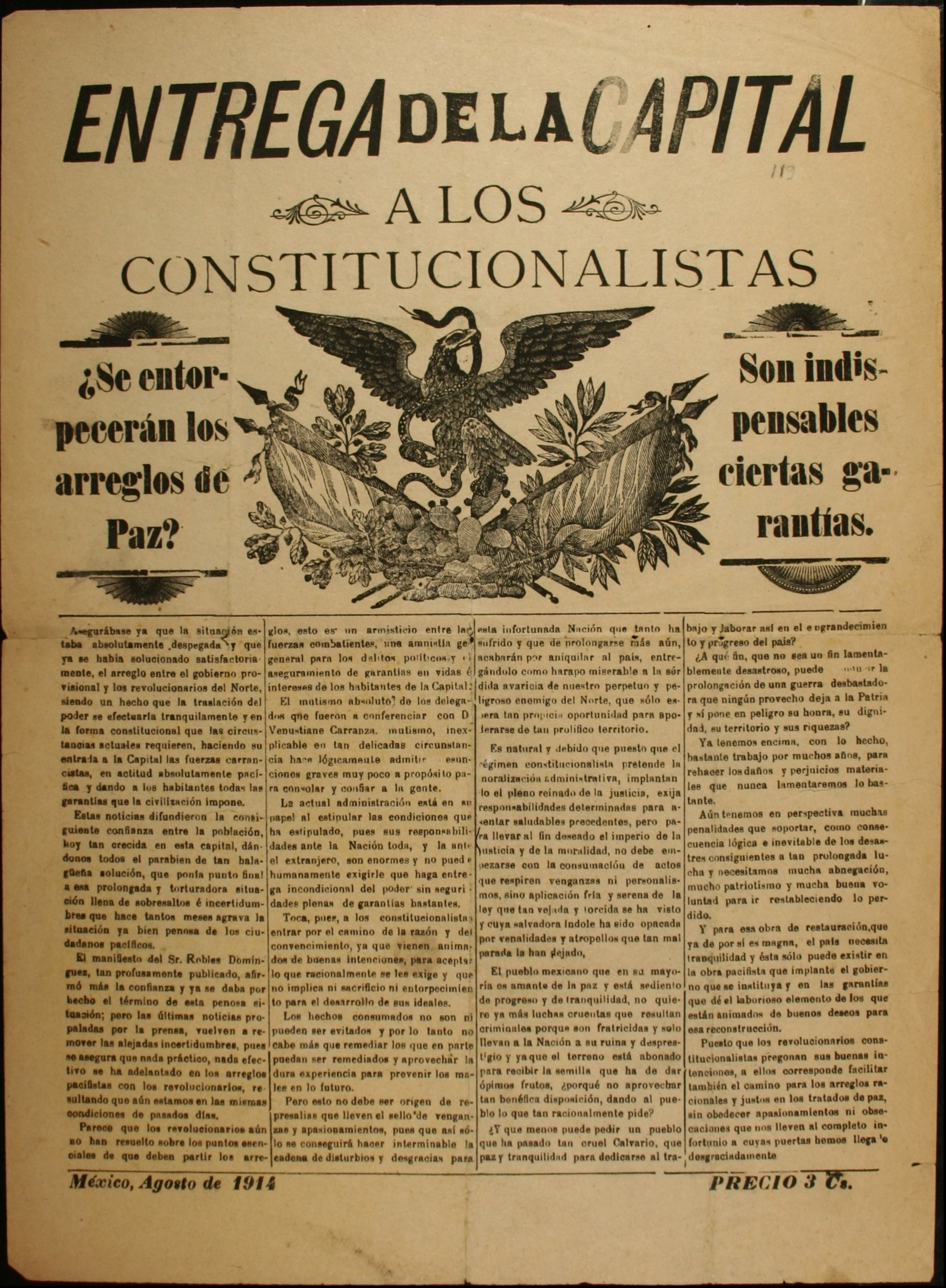
Printed flyer saying, "Handing over the capital to the constitutionalists."

Events in the year 1914 in Mexico.

== Incumbents ==
=== Federal government ===
- President -Victoriano Huerta, Francisco Carvajal, Venustiano Carranza
- Secretary of the Interior: Ignacio Alcocer, José María Luján, Eliseo Arredondo, Rafael Zubarán Capmay.

=== Governors ===
- Aguascalientes:
- Campeche: Joaquín Mucel Acereto
- Chiapas: José Ascención González/Blas Corral/Pablo Villanueva
- Chihuahua: Fidel Ávila/Silvestre Terrazas/Ignacio C. Enríquez
- Coahuila: Bruno Neyra/Alfredo Breceda/Gustavo Espinoza Mireles
- Colima: Interim Governors
- Durango:
- Guanajuato: Fernando Dávila
- Hidalgo: Provisional Governors
- Jalisco: Manuel Aguirre Berlanga/Manuel M. Diéguez/Julián Medina
- State of Mexico: Gustavo Baz/Pascual Morales y Molina
- Michoacán: Gertrudis Sánchez
- Morelos: Agustín Bretón y Trillanes/Gregorio G. Mejía/Pedro Ojeda/Genovevo de la O
- Nayarit:
- Nuevo León: Antonio de la Paz Guerra/Antonio L. Villarreal
- Oaxaca:
- Puebla:
- Querétaro: Joaquín F. Chicarro/José Antonio Septién/Francisco Murguía/Federico Montes
- San Luis Potosí: Juan G. Barragán Rodríguez
- Sinaloa: Ramón F. Iturbe
- Sonora: José María Maytorena
- Tabasco: Joaquín Ruiz/Luis Hernández Hermosillo/Heriberto Jara Corona
- Tamaulipas: Alfredo Ricaut/Andrés Osuna
- Tlaxcala: Manuel Cuéllar Alarcón/Luis J. García/Máximo Rojas/Alejo González
- Veracruz:
- Yucatán: Salvador Alvarado Rubio
- Zacatecas:

== Events ==
- April 9 – Tampico Affair
- April 21 – United States occupation of Veracruz
- June 23 – Battle of Zacatecas (1914)
- July – Rural Guard is disbanded
- July 14 – Victoriano Huerta resigns from the Presidency of Mexico
- August – Venustiano Carranza and the Constitutionalist Army enter Mexico City
- October 10 to November 13 – Convention of Aguascalientes in which Venustiano Carranza is deposed as Number One Chief of the Mexican Revolution
- November 6 – Eulalio Gutiérrez is declared President of Mexico during the Convention of Aguascalientes
- November – Venustiano Carranza leaves Mexico City for Veracruz
- December – Pancho Villa and Emiliano Zapata occupy Mexico City
- December 4 – Pancho Villa and Emiliano Zapata meet in Xochimilco

== Notable births ==
- March 31 – Octavio Paz, writer, poet, and diplomat, and the winner of the 1990 Nobel Prize in Literature
- April 8 – María Félix, actress and singer (d. 2002)
