= 1916 in Mexico =

- Decades: 1890s; 1900s; 1910s; 1920s; 1930s
- See also: History of Mexico; List of years in Mexico; Timeline of Mexican history

Events from the year 1916 in Mexico.

== Incumbents ==
=== Federal government ===
- President: Venustiano Carranza

=== Governors ===
- Aguascalientes:
- Campeche: Joaquín Mucel Acereto
- Chiapas: José Ascención González/Blas Corral/Pablo Villanueva
- Chihuahua: Arnulfo González
- Coahuila: Bruno Neyra/Alfredo Breceda/Gustavo Espinoza Mireles
- Colima: Interim Governors
- Durango:
- Guanajuato: Fernando Dávila
- Hidalgo:
- Jalisco: Manuel M. Diéguez/Emiliano Degollado
- State of Mexico: Pascual Morales y Molina/Rafael Cepeda
- Michoacán: Alfredo Elizondo
- Morelos: Lorenzo Vázquez/Dionisio Carreón
- Nayarit: José Santos Godínez
- Nuevo León: Nicéforo Zambrano
- Oaxaca: Juan Jiménez Méndez
- Puebla:
- Querétaro: Federico Montes
- San Luis Potosí: Juan G. Barragán Rodríguez
- Sinaloa: Ramón F. Iturbe
- Sonora: Plutarco Elías Calles
- Tabasco: Joaquín Ruiz/Luis Hernández Hermosillo/Heriberto Jara Corona
- Tamaulipas: Alfredo Ricaut/Andrés Osuna
- Tlaxcala:
- Veracruz:
- Yucatán: Salvador Alvarado Rubio
- Zacatecas:

== Events ==
- March 9 – Battle of Columbus
- March 29 – Battle of Guerrero
- April 12 – Battle of Parral
- May 5 – Glenn Springs Raid
- June 15 – San Ygnacio Raid
- June 21 – Battle of Carrizal

== Births ==
- February 14
  - Juan Celada Salmón, engineer (Ternium) and inventor (Proceso HYL) (d. 2017)
  - Leopoldo Sánchez Celis, Governor of Sinaloa 1963–1968 (d. 1989)
- April 11 — Armando León Bejarano, governor of Morelos (1976-1982) (d. 2016)
- June 12 – Raúl Héctor Castro, Mexican-born American politician (Democratic Party), governor of Arizona, diplomat, and judge (d. April 10, 2015).

== Deaths ==
- January 13 – Victoriano Huerta, 35th President of Mexico (b. 1850)
- April 16 — Amador Salazar was a leader of the Liberation Army of the South during the Mexican Revolution (b. 1868)

== Notes ==
- Beede, Benjamin R. (1994). The War of 1898, and U.S. Interventions, 1898-1934: An Encyclopedia. Taylor & Francis. p. 218. ISBN 9780824056247.
