= 1918 in Mexico =

- Decades: 1890s; 1900s; 1910s; 1920s; 1930s
- See also: History of Mexico; List of years in Mexico; Timeline of Mexican history

Events from the year 1918 in Mexico.

== Incumbents ==
=== Federal government ===
- President: Venustiano Carranza

=== Governors ===
- Aguascalientes: Aurelio L. González
- Campeche: Joaquín Mucel Acereto
- Chiapas: Manuel Fuentes A./Pablo Villanueva
- Chihuahua: Arnulfo González/Manuel Herrera Marmolejo/Ramón Gómez y Salas/Ignacio C. Enríquez/Andrés Ortiz
- Coahuila: Gustavo Espinoza Mireles
- Colima: Interim Governors
- Durango:
- Guanajuato: Agustín Alcocer
- Guerrero: Francisco Figueroa Mata
- Hidalgo: Nicolás Flores Rubio
- Jalisco: Emiliano Degollado/Manuel Bouquet Jr.
- State of Mexico: Agustín Millán Vivero/Joaquín García Luna
- Michoacán: Porfirio García de León
- Morelos:
- Nayarit: José Santos Godínez
- Nuevo León: Nicéforo Zambrano
- Oaxaca: Juan Jiménez Méndez
- Puebla: Alfonso Cabrera Lobato
- Querétaro: Ernesto Perrusquía
- San Luis Potosí: Juan G. Barragán Rodríguez
- Sinaloa: Ramón F. Iturbe
- Sonora: Plutarco Elías Calles
- Tabasco: Joaquín Ruiz/Luis Hernández Hermosillo/Heriberto Jara Corona
- Tamaulipas: Alfredo Ricaut/Andrés Osuna
- Tlaxcala: Luis M. Hernandez/Máximo Rojas
- Veracruz: Cándido Aguilar Vargas
- Yucatán: Salvador Alvarado Rubio
- Zacatecas:

== Events ==
- March 25 – Neville Ranch Raid
- August 27 – Battle of Ambos Nogales

== Births ==
- April 28 – Ramón Valdiosera, designer, painter, writer, cartoonist (d. 2017).
- November 20 – Lorenzo Servitje, businessman and philanthropist, co-founder of Grupo Bimbo (d. 2017)
- December 1: Alfredo Guati Rojo, watercolor artist (d. June 10, 2003)
- Date unknown: Jacinto Adriano Wong Romero; Progreso, Yucatán Catholic priest (d. 2018)
