= Usabiaga =

Usabiaga is a Basque surname. Notable people with this surname include:

- Ana Usabiaga (born 1990), Spanish track cyclist
- Eduardo Usabiaga y Llaguno (1891–1973), Cuban diplomat
- Irene Usabiaga (born 1993), Spanish road and track cyclist
- Javier Usabiaga Arroyo (1939–2018), Mexican businessman and politician
- José Luis Oliveros Usabiaga (born 1983), Mexican politician
