= 1913 in Mexico =

- Decades: 1890s; 1900s; 1910s; 1920s; 1930s
- See also: History of Mexico; List of years in Mexico; Timeline of Mexican history

Events from the year 1913 in Mexico.

== Incumbents ==
=== Federal government ===
- President:
  - Francisco I. Madero (until February 19)
  - Pedro Lascuráin (c. 45 minutes on February 19)
  - Victoriano Huerta (starting February 19)
- Vice-President: José María Pino Suárez
- Secretary of the Interior: Rafael Hernández, Alberto García Granados, Aureliano Urrutia, Manuel Garza Aldape, Ignacio Alcocer

=== Governors ===
- Aguascalientes: Alberto Fuentes Dávila
- Campeche: Manuel Castilla Brito/Felipe Bueno/Manuel Rojas Moranos/Manuel Rivera
- Chiapas: Flavio Guillén/Marco Aurelio Solís/Reynaldo Gordillo León/Bernardo Palafox
- Chihuahua: Abraham González/Antonio Rábago/Salvador R. Mercado/Francisco Villa
- Coahuila: Ignacio Alcocer/Venustiano Carranza
- Colima: José Trinidad Alamillo/Vidal Fernández/Miguel M. Morales/Julián Jaramillo/Juan A. Hernández
- Durango:
- Guanajuato: Fernando Dávila
- Hidalgo: Interim Governors
- Jalisco: José M. Mier
- State of Mexico: José Refugio Velasco/Joaquín Beltrán Castañares
- Michoacán: Gertrudis Sánchez
- Morelos: Patricio Leyva Ochoa/Francisco Sánchez/Benito Tajonar/Juvencio Robles/Julián Arreola/Adolfo Jiménez Castro
- Nayarit:
- Nuevo León: Antonio L. Villarreal/Salomé Botello
- Oaxaca:
- Puebla:
- Querétaro: Joaquín F. Chicarro
- San Luis Potosí: Rafael Cepeda
- Sinaloa:
- Sonora: José María Maytorena
- Tabasco:
- Tamaulipas: Matías Guerra/José C. Mainero/Joaquín Argüelles/Antonio Rabago/Ignacio Zaragoza Morelos
- Tlaxcala: Antonio Hidalgo Sandoval/Agustín Sánchez/Agustín Maldonado/José Mariano Grajales/Alberto Yarza/Manuel Cuéllar Alarcón
- Veracruz: Antonio Pérez Rivera
- Yucatán:
- Zacatecas:

== Events ==
- February 9–19 — Ten Tragic Days
- February 19 — Victoriano Huerta elected president
- March 23 — Battle of Nogales (1913)
- April 8–13 — Battle of Naco
- November 23–24 — Battle of Tierra Blanca

== Births ==
- January 20 — Chucho Navarro, singer and composer (d. 1993)
- February 5
  - Oscar Flores Tapia, journalist, writer, and politician (PRI); Governor of Coahuila 1975–1981 (d. 1988)
  - María Luisa Zea, singer and actress (d. 1993)
- July 22 — Esteban Reyes, tennis player (d. 2014)

== Deaths ==
- January 20 — José Guadalupe Posada, lithographer and cartoonist (b. 1852)
- February 9 — Bernardo Reyes, general and politician (b. 1850)
- February 18 — Gustavo A. Madero, Mexican Revolution participant (b. 1875)
- February 22
  - Francisco I. Madero, 33rd President of Mexico (b. 1873)
  - José María Pino Suárez, 7th Vice President of Mexico (b. 1869)
- March 7 — Abraham González, provisional and constitutional Governor of Chihuahua (b. 1864)
- October 7 — Belisario Domínguez, physician and liberal politician (b. 1863)
