= Antonio Norzagaray =

Mexican revolutionary soldier and politician (1888–1918)

Governor of Aguascalientes
- In office 14 January 1917 – 10 June 1917

Delegate to the 1916–17 Constitutional Convention for the Federal District's 9th
- In office 1 December 1916 – 5 February 1917

Personal details
- Born: Antonio Norzagaray Ángulo; 27 March 1888 Guasave, Sinaloa, Mexico
- Died: 1 September 1918 (aged 30) Aguascalientes, Aguascalientes, Mexico
- Occupation: Revolutionary, Politician

Antonio Norzagaray Ángulo (Note: In this Mexican name, the surname is Norzagaray and the second or maternal family name is Ángulo.) (27 March 1888 – 1 September 1918) was a Mexican army officer who fought for the Constitutionalists in the 1910–1917 Revolution. He represented Tacuba in the 1916–17 Constitutional Convention in Querétaro and later served as the interim governor of Aguascalientes.

== Life ==
Antonio Norzagaray Ángulo was born in Guasave, Sinaloa, on 27 March 1888. At the outbreak of the Mexican Revolution in 1910, he was working at a mine in Cananea, Sonora, and joined the forces supporting Francisco I. Madero under the command of Gen. Perfecto Lomelí; he saw action, and was wounded, in Naco, Sonora. After Madero's installation as president in 1911, he was charged by Governor José María Maytorena with leading the Rural Guard ("los rurales") in Sonora, combating banditry and facing down the state's restless Yaqui natives.

Following the February 2013 assassination of President Madero, he took up arms against the regime of Victoriano Huerta. He was named chief of the revolutionary forces in San Blas, Nayarit, but was relieved shortly after by Gen. Ramón Iturbe, who appointed him his chief of staff. He saw action at Sinaloa, Sinaloa, in October 1913, and at other engagements in Sinaloa. Leading the Antúnez Brigade, he then joined Gen. Lucio Blanco on his march towards Mexico City. When Blanco withdrew his support for Venustiano Carranza's Constitutional Army and Norzagaray refused, he was imprisoned in the capital and threatened with a firing squad. Norzagaray managed to escape and, by way of New Orleans, fled to the port of Veracruz where he placed himself at Carranza's command. For health reasons, Carranza assigned him to rearguard duties instead of front line combat, and in that capacity he led the Convoy de la Victoria from Veracruz to provide Gen. Álvaro Obregón with much-needed supplies for his victory over the Villistas in the April 1915 Second Battle of Celaya.

In the 1916 election to the Constitutional Convention in Querétaro, Norzagaray was elected to represent the Federal District's 9th district (the municipality of Tacuba). He took ill during the convention and had to request a two-week leave of absence from the proceedings on 5 December 1916; he was replaced by his alternate, Francisco Espinosa Peñarrieta, for most of the debates. On 14 January 1917, Norzagaray requested an indefinite leave of absence to assume the position of governor of Aguascalientes that Carranza had conferred on him; he was, however, present for the signing of the newly enacted Constitution on 5 February 1917.

In January 1917, Carranza appointed Norzagaray interim governor of Aguascalientes, with the task of organising elections for governor, the state congress and judges of the state's Supreme Court. Aurelio L. González was elected and took office on 10 June 1917. Gen. Norzagaray was then sent to the state of Michoacán, to combat the banditry of former Villista revolutionary José Inés García Chávez. His health worsening, he asked the Secretary of War to be relieved of his duties. He returned to the city of Aguascalientes, where he died on 1 September 1918, at the age of 30. His remains were interred in Mexico City's Panteón Francés and, in 1968, an ejido named in his honour was established in the municipality of Guasave.

== Family ==
Antonio Norzagaray Ángulo's parents were Manuel Norzagaray and Rosenda Ángulo. His siblings included Bernardo, a two-term member of the Chamber of Deputies and mayor of Juárez, Chihuahua, and Natalia Rosenda, who married Enrique Moreno Pérez, a fellow Constitutionalist and later president of the Supreme Court of Justice of the Nation.
