= 1912 in Mexico =

- Decades: 1890s; 1900s; 1910s; 1920s; 1930s
- See also: History of Mexico; List of years in Mexico; Timeline of Mexican history

Events from the year 1912 in Mexico.

== Incumbents ==
=== Federal government ===
- President: Francisco I. Madero
- Vice President: José María Pino Suárez
- Secretary of the Interior: Abraham González (governor) until February, Jesús Flores Magón until November, Rafael Hernandez

=== Governors ===
- Aguascalientes: Alberto Fuentes Dávila
- Campeche: Manuel Castilla Brito
- Chiapas: Reynaldo Gordillo León/Flavio Guillén
- Chihuahua: Aureliano L. González/Abraham González/Felipe R. Gutiérrez
- Coahuila: Venustiano Carranza
- Colima: José Trinidad Alamillo/Miguel García Topete
- Durango:
- Guanajuato:
- Hidalgo: Interim Governors
- Jalisco: Alberto Robles Gil/José López Portillo y Rojas
- State of Mexico:
- Michoacán:
- Morelos: Ambrosio Figueroa/Francisco Naranjo/Aniceto Villamar Velázquez/Patricio Leyva Ochoa
- Nayarit:
- Nuevo León: Viviano L. Villarreal
- Oaxaca:
- Puebla:
- Querétaro:
- San Luis Potosí: Rafael Cepeda
- Sinaloa:
- Sonora: José María Maytorena
- Tabasco:
- Tamaulipas:
- Tlaxcala: Antonio Hidalgo Sandoval
- Veracruz: Manuel María Alegre/Francisco Lagos Cházaro Mortero/Antonio Pérez Rivera
- Yucatán:
- Zacatecas:

== Events ==
- March 24 – First Battle of Rellano
- May 22 – Second Battle of Rellano

== Deaths ==
- September 13 – Justo Sierra
- November 10 – Ramon Corral
