= Enrique Moreno Pérez =

Mexican politician and jurist (1877–1932)

Supreme Court Justice
- In office 18 August 1931 – 1 January 1932

Governor of Puebla
- In office 4 November 1924 – January/February 2025

President of the Supreme Court
- In office June 1920 – May 1922

Supreme Court Justice
- In office 1 June 1917 – 31 May 1923

Political Chief of Southern Baja California
- In office 27 September 1916 – 24 March 1917

Personal details
- Born: 15 June 1877 Mocorito, Sinaloa, Mexico
- Died: 1 January 1932 (aged 54) Federal District, Mexico
- Education: Colegio Civil Rosales
- Occupation: Judge, Politician
- Profession: Lawyer

Enrique Moreno Pérez (Note: In this Mexican name, the surname is Moreno and the second or maternal family name is Pérez.) (15 June 1877 – 1 January 1932) was a Mexican politician and jurist. He served as politicial chief of the southern district of Baja California, as a member of the Supreme Court of Justice of the Nation, and as interim governor of Puebla.

== Early years ==
Enrique Moreno Pérez was born in Mocorito, Sinaloa, on 15 June 1877. After basic education in his home town, he studied for his baccalaureate and a degree in law (1902) at the Colegio Civil Rosales in Culiacán. After graduating he taught at the same institution and, in 1903, he was appointed as a notary public and, later that year, as a first-instance judge.

== Mexican Revolution ==
In 1910, Moreno joined the anti-reelectionist club in Culiacán, part of the movement led by Francisco I. Madero opposing the continued rule of President Porfirio Díaz. That same year, he ran for a seat in the Chamber of Deputies. Following the outbreak of fighting in the 1910–1917 Revolution, he participated in the siege of Culiacán and the expulsion of federal forces from the city. He was elected to the Supreme Court of Sinaloa in 1911 and assumed his seat in 1912 after a period serving in the state government. In 1912 he contended, unsuccessfully, for the governorship of Sinaloa.

He resigned from the state's Supreme Court in protest at the February 1913 assassination of President Madero and, in April, took up arms against the regime of Victoriano Huerta. He fought in several battles in Sinaloa and Sonora, and he served as judge in the latter state before resigning in May 1914 when Governor José María Maytorena broke with the Constitutionalist forces of Venustiano Carranza.

In August 1914, he left to serve in the military justice system in Mexico City and, in late 1914 and early 1915, he accompanied General Álvaro Obregón on his campaigns against the factions led by Francisco Villa and Emiliano Zapata. By August 1915, he was back in Sonora, serving as secretary of government under Governor Plutarco Elías Calles; in that capacity, he oversaw the enactment of an amnesty for any of Villa's men who deserted and joined the Constitutionalists in Sonora. In the aftermath of Villa's raid on Columbus, New Mexico, on 9 March 1916, and fearing an incursion by the armed forces of the United States, he urged Calles to strengthen his defences on the state's northern border.

On 27 September 1916, on instructions from Carranza, Moreno took office as politicial chief and military commander of the southern district of Baja California. During his time in the territory, he imposed a ban on the consumption of alcohol, established a mechanism for the supply of basic goods at moderate prices, and created the municipality of Santa Rosalía. He also wrote to the Constituent Congress of Querétaro, urging them to grant statehood to the federal territory of Baja California, but his entreaties failed to prosper. (Note: The territory's northern portion was admitted to the federation as the state of Baja California in 1952, while the southern half only gained statehood, as Baja California Sur, in 1974.) His term in office ended on 24 March 1917 and he left Baja California that month.

In June 1917 he again contended for the governorship of Sinaloa, but lost to Ramón F. Iturbe. The local authorities in Mocorito – where Moreno narrowly beat Iturbe – and in El Fuerte, Ahome and Guasave initially refused to accept the result but by August the resistance had ended.

== Post-Revolution ==
The Constitutionalists suspended the operations of the federal Supreme Court from August 2014 to May 1917. When the court was re-established, Carranza nominated Moreno Pérez for a seat. Congress elected him to a two-year term, starting 1 June 1917, and to a second term, running from 1919 to 1923. In June 1920, his colleagues on the court elected him president (chief justice), and he served in that position until May 1922. His term on the Supreme Court ended on 31 May 1923, when he returned to private practice in Mexico City.

On 4 November 1924, the Congress of Puebla voted to appoint Moreno Pérez the interim governor of the state, replacing José María Sánchez Rojas, who had resigned his under pressure from President Álvaro Obregón. Moreno's chief tasks as governor were to re-establish the constitutional order and to organise fresh elections, which were won by Claudio N. Tirado.

Moreno returned to the federal judiciary in October 1929 as a circuit judge. On 18 August 1931, President Pascual Ortiz Rubio appointed him to the Supreme Court as a replacement for the recently deceased Juan José Sánchez. He died in office on 1 January 1932 and was buried in Lomas de Reforma, Mexico City.

== Family ==
Moreno was one of eight children of Miguel Moreno Leyva and María de Jesús Pérez Escobosa. He married Natalia Rosenda Norzagaray Ángulo (Note: The sister of Antonio Norzagaray Ángulo, who was elected to the 1916–1917 Constituent Congress of Querétaro and later served as governor of Aguascalientes.) (1890–1988) in Guasave on 29 July 1908. The union produced no offspring.
