= Ruben Torres =

Ruben Torres may refer to:

== People ==
- Ruben Torres (Filipino politician) (born 1941), Filipino politician and activist
- Rubén Torres (footballer) (born 1949), Venezuelan footballer
- Rubén Torres (tennis) (born 1981), Colombian tennis player
- Rubén Torres Llorca (born 1957), Cuban artist
- Rubén Alfredo Torres Zavala (born 1968), Mexican politician

== Other ==
- Ruben M. Torres Unit, state prison in Hondo, Texas
