= Jamby =

Jamby is a given name. Notable people with the name include:

- Jamby El Favo (born 1995), Puerto Rican rapper, singer and songwriter
- Jamby Madrigal (born 1958), Filipina politician
