= 1911 in Mexico =

- Decades: 1890s; 1900s; 1910s; 1920s; 1930s
- See also: History of Mexico; List of years in Mexico; Timeline of Mexican history

Events from the year 1911 in Mexico.

== Incumbents ==
=== Federal government ===
- President – Porfirio Diaz until May 25, Francisco León de la Barra until November 5, Francisco I. Madero from November 6
- Vice President: Ramón Corral, José María Pino Suárez from November 25
- Secretary of Foreign Affairs: Enrique C. Creel Cuilty, Victoriano Salado Álvarez, Francisco Leon de la Barra, Bartolomé Carvajal y Rosas, Manuel Calero
- Secretary of the Interior: Ramon Corral, Emilio Vázquez Gómez, Alberto García Granados, Abraham González (governor) from November 6

=== Governors ===
- Aguascalientes: Alberto Fuentes Dávila
- Campeche: Manuel Castilla Brito
- Chiapas: José Inés Cano/Ramón Rabasa/Manuel Trejo/Manuel Rovelo Argüello/Manuel Rovelo Argüello/Marco Aurelio Solís/Reynaldo Gordillo León
- Chihuahua: Alberto Terrazas Cuilty/Abraham González/Miguel Ahumada/Aureliano L. González
- Coahuila: Venustiano Carranza
- Colima: Miguel García Topete
- Durango:
- Guanajuato:
- Hidalgo:
- Jalisco: David Gutiérrez Allende/Alberto Robles Gil
- State of Mexico:
- Michoacán:
- Morelos: Pablo Escandón Barrón/Francisco Leyva Arciniegas/Juan Nepomuceno Carreón/Ambrosio Figueroa
- Nayarit:
- Nuevo León: Viviano L. Villarreal
- Oaxaca:
- Puebla:
- Querétaro: Adolfo de la Isla/Alfonso M. Veraza/José Antonio Septién/Carlos M. Loyola
- San Luis Potosí: José María Espinosa y Cuevas/Rafael Cepeda
- Sinaloa:
- Sonora: José María Maytorena
- Tabasco:
- Tamaulipas:
- Tlaxcala:
- Veracruz: Teodoro A. Dehesa Méndez/Emilio Léycegui/León Aillaud/Manuel María Alegre
- Yucatán: José María Pino Suárez/Jesús L. González
- Zacatecas:

== Events ==
- January 29 – Capture of Mexicali
- April – First Battle of Agua Prieta
- April 7–May 10 – Battle of Ciudad Juarez (1911)
- May 8–9 – First Battle of Tijuana
- May 11–19 – Battle of Cuautla (1911)
- May 15 – Torreón massacre
- June 22 – Second Battle of Tijuana

== Births ==
- February 14 – Nabor Carrillo Flores, third son of Mexican composer Julián Carrillo Trujillo (d. 1961)
- March 12 – Gustavo Diaz Ordaz, 49th President of Mexico (d. 1979)
- March 29 – Mario Pani, architect and urbanist (d. 1993)
- July 10 — Amalia Solórzano, First Lady of Mexico (1934-1940) (d. 2008)
- August 3 — Manuel Esperón, composer (d. 2011)
- August 12 – Cantinflas, comic film actor, producer, and screenwriter (d. 1993)
- November 30 – Jorge Negrete, singer, actor (d. 1953)
- Date unknown — Josefina Vicens, novelist (d. 1988)

== Deaths ==
- March 24: Pablo Torres Burgos, who along with Emiliano Zapata and Rafael Merino began the Revolution in Morelos on March 11, 1911 (b. 1878

== See also ==
- Mexican Revolution
