= Ángel Norzagaray =

Mexican playwright and academic (1961–2021)

Ángel Norzagaray Norzagaray (Note: In this Mexican name, both the surname and the second or maternal family name are Norzagaray.) (17 August 1961 – 27 December 2021) was a Mexican playwright, actor, director and academic.

== Life and work ==
Ángel Norzagaray was born in Guasave, Sinaloa, in 1961. He studied for a bachelor's degree in acting at the Universidad Veracruzana and later obtained a doctorate in Spanish literature from the University of Valladolid in Spain.

One of his most notable works was the libretto for the opera La emperatriz de la mentira ("The Empress of Lies"), about the life of Carlota, Empress of Mexico, with music by Dimitri Dudin. Adapted from Fernando del Paso's novel Noticias del Imperio, it had its première in Tijuana, Baja California, in 2012.

Other works included El velorio de los mangos, Una isla llamada California (jointly with Jesús González Dávila), Los efectos del príncipe and Elegías mexicalenses. He also founded Mexicali a Secas, a theatre group based in Mexicali, Baja California, and directed the Baja California Institute of Culture.

Norzagaray taught at the Autonomous University of Baja California (UABC), where he also held administrative positions and served as the university's vice-rector. During his career he won various awards and recognitions, such as the State Journalism Award of Baja California, the State Literature Award of Baja California, and the 2012 Xavier Villaurrutia Medal awarded by the National Institute of Fine Arts (INBA).

He died in Mexicali on 27 December 2021, aged 60, after being diagnosed with cancer several years earlier.
