= José Siurob =

Mexican politician

José María Siurob Ramírez y Gutiérrez
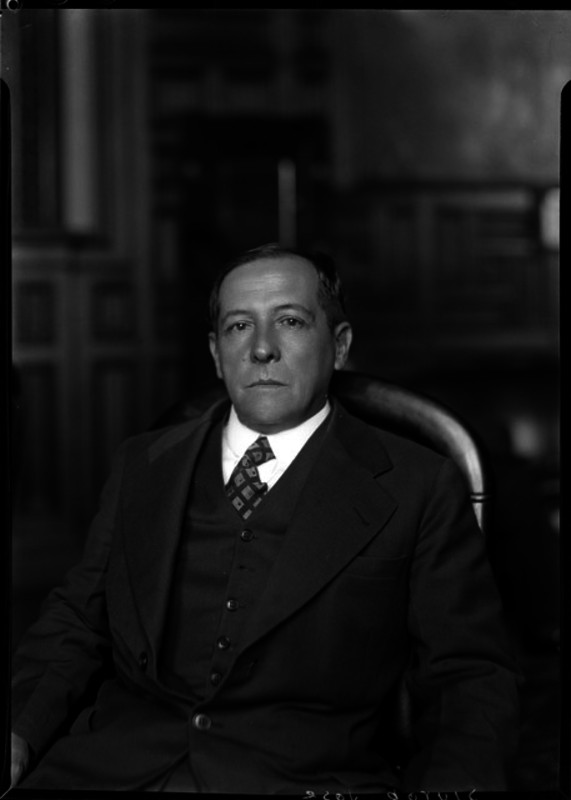
- Born: November 14, 1886; Querétaro
- Died: November 5, 1965 (age −79); Mexico City
- Military career
- Rank: General
- Conflicts: Mexican Revolution

José María Siurob Ramírez y Gutiérrez better known as José Siurob Ramírez (November 6, 1886 – November 5, 1965) was a Mexican military general who participated in the Mexican Revolution. He was governor of the states of Querétaro and Guanajuato and of the territory of Quintana Roo. He was also head of the Department of Public Health under President Lázaro Cárdenas del Río and at the same time head of the Central Federal District.

== Early life ==
Born in the city of Querétaro on November 14, 1886. Son Emiliano Siurob Cosío and Guadalupe Ramirez Gutierrez.

=== Military career ===
He made a career in medicine at the National School of Medicine, he graduated but once the fight. He supported the Madero and constitutionalist movements. He was founder and president of the Liberal Constitutionalist Party. Among the political positions he held was four times elected federal deputy and governor of Guanajuato and Querétaro. In Quintana Roo was governor of federal territory, commander of the military zone and founder of the Bank of the Army. He stressed as secretary of Health and Welfare and head of the Central Federal District. For reasons of health he retired from politics in 1945, during his tenure as Director of Social Services of the Army. He died in Mexico City in 1965.

=== Studies ===
He studied basic education in the Catholic High School of Querétaro. He later studied at the National School of Medicine, where he earned his degree in 1912. There he also began his political life as a student leader, organized the first demonstrations against the administration of President Porfirio Díaz. He returned to Querétaro to get his degree. There he set up his private practice, where in addition to serving low-income people, supported them to buy their medicines.

=== Mexican Revolution ===
He was founder and President of the Liberal Constitutionalist Party.

He joined the armed movement of Venustiano Carranza as a doctor in the Army Corps Northeast. After the triumph of the movement, claimed his right to the state government, he belongs under the Plan of Guadalupe, but having been the forces of Don Pablo González who occupied Querétaro, was postponed to give the post to Colonel Federico Montes, Guanajuato.

When the split Villista, then-Lieutenant happened Colonel Jose Siurob was in Veracruz with President Carranza, and formed the Army of operations commanded the Gral. Alvaro Obregon and it would end with Villismo, he was given the rank of Colonel and command of Brigadier General Escobedo, adding the group forces commanded by General. Fortunato Maicote.

He was in the Battle of Peon, near San Juan del Rio, and it was his soldiers who occupied Querétaro early April 16, 1916, Dr. Siurob assuming the governorship of the state. Subsequently, politically motivated they determined that the government will exchange the Guanajuato Querétaro, which he held until 1917.

=== Political career ===
From 1917 to 1925 he was Federal Deputy for the District of Cadereyta. From 1926 until 1928 he was Governor of the Territory of Quintana Roo.

He left the government of the territory of Quintana Roo to serve as Governor of the Federal District for a little over a year, and then Head of the Department of Public Health from 1935 to 1938 and again from 1939 to 1940. His tenure in the Ministry for the inauguration highlighted large social projects. He initiated the construction of hospitals in Ixtlan de Juarez and Arcela and adapted and repaired the Leprosy Hospital Sarabia. He continued the work of the quarantine station in Manzanillo and Dr. Pedro Lopez Leprosy Zoquiapan. He also finished the Institute of Tropical Diseases.

At the end of his office, he had left traces initiated and guidelines for the General Hospital. In the army he reached the highest rank of Major general.

For reasons of health he retired from politics in 1945, as Director of Social Services of the Army.

Governor of the Federal Territory of Quintana Roo (1927–1930). General brigade and medical. He completed professional studies at the National School of Medicine in Mexico City until 1911, when he stopped to participate in the Mexican Revolution, in which he received the rank of brigadier general.

In this fight he participated in the taking of Tampico and San Luis Potosí, and in fighting against Francisco Villa Leon, among others. After the Revolution finished his medical studies.

=== Other related ===
It was federal deputy five times: two presidents of Congress. In 1914 governor of Querétaro, Guanajuato Governor of 1915–1916.

The December 20, 1927 he was appointed governor of Quintana Roo, although he took on February 14, 1928. Its management has been recognized as one of the most outstanding in the Territory.

The construction of the first roads to nearby villages started; -deposits the first cisterns where rainwater is captured to replace the airfield población—Morelos and market Leona Vicario was built, telephone service to Payo Bishop (now Chetumal) was introduced and villages located in the banks of the Rio Hondo.

Overall, it boosted the economy of the capital of the Territory. He began construction of the Civil Hospital, whose foundations were then utilized for the construction of the Reform School (Hospital Morelos).

He promoted the creation of the second coat of Quintana Roo, which was developed by Gaetano Maglione. He initiated the involvement of some estates and cooperatives organized the first.

On June 2, 1929, he signed with the Indian General Francisco May the historic peace agreement and obedience, in which they highlighted: the willingness of the federal government to grant forest concessions in the Maya leaders freedom to sell their products; in return, the Indians respected the concessions of others; Mayan authorized the establishment of schools in their communities and the suppression of flogging (whipping stack); They swore allegiance to the national flag and hoisting never promised not English; the presence of the delegate of government was accepted, but this would be helped by a board of five appointed by Mayans themselves.

In that event, considered by many historians as the real end of the Caste War, a Mayan soldier and other federal originating in Juchitan, Oaxaca, hug symbolizing the end of strife occurred.

Furthermore, gum production reached record levels (1929). In 1930 he championed the Territory. He was inspector of the Army (1932–1934), chief of military health (1934–1935), head of the Central Department (1938) and head of the Department of Public Health (1939–1940). He built the first hospital in Huipulco tuberculosis; Sarabia, Guanajuato, a hospital for lepers; Algeria, Michoacan one for sick pinta, and others in Huixtla, Chiapas, Ixtlan, Oaxaca, and La Laguna, Coahuila.

In 1938 he created the Biotech Institute, a pioneer in Mexico for research and manufacture of vaccines and serums for animals; and the following year the Institute of Tropical Diseases. He represented Mexico in the Pan American Health Directors Conference in Washington (1936–1940). He was awarded several times: gold medal of the government and Congress of Puebla, by the national temperance campaign; award second and third seniority in the Army; gold medal for work of Public Health in 1939, award "Defenders of the Republic" as a descendant of the liberator Hidalgo, which was in third grade nephew.

== Last year ==
He authored several scientific and military trials as well as articles and speeches of different nature, including. Geographic trial Territory of Quintana Roo, modern trends in Mexico health and social medicine in Mexico. Retired in 1945, he died in Mexico City in 1965.

Preceded by Gustavo M. Bravo; Abel B. Serratos; Antonio Ancona Albertos; Cosme Hinojosa	Governor of Querétaro; 1915	Succeeded by Federico Montes; Fernando Dávila; Daniel García de la Ribera; Javier Rojo Gómez

== Sources ==
- Camp, Roderic A. (2014). Mexican Political Biographies, 1884–1934. University of Texas Press. ISBN 978-0292751194.
- Herr, Robert W.; Herr, Richard (1999). An American Family in the Mexican Revolution. SR Books. ISBN 9780842027243.
- Naranjo, Francisco (1935). Revolutionary Biographical Dictionary (Editorial Printing "Cosmos" edition). Mexico.
- Redmond, Helen (July 2013). "The political economy of Mexico's drug war". International Socialist Review (90).
