= Martín Malagón Ríos =

Mexican politician (born 1964)

- Born: 9 August 1964 (age 61); Guanajuato, Mexico
- Occupation: Politician
- Political party: PAN

Martín Malagón Ríos (born 9 August 1964) is a Mexican politician affiliated with the National Action Party (PAN). In the 2006 general election, he was elected to the Chamber of Deputies to represent Guanajuato's 14th district during the 60th session of Congress.
