= Pedro Rodriguez (scientist) =

Puerto Rican scientist

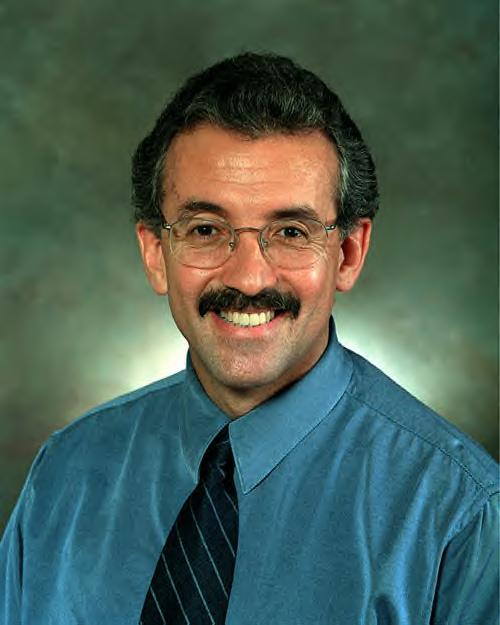
- Born: 1953 (age 72–73); Brooklyn, New York
- Occupations: inventor, scientist

Notes
- Invented a portable, battery-operated lift seat for people suffering from knee arthritis. Rodríguez is the son of Puerto Rican salsa singer, Pellin Rodríguez.

Pedro Rodriguez (born 1953) is an American scientist who is the Director of a test laboratory at NASA and inventor of a portable, battery-operated lift seat for people suffering from knee arthritis.

== Early years ==
Pedro Rodriguez was born in Brooklyn, New York to the Puerto Rican salsa singer, Pellin Rodríguez and Elba Lopez Perez, who met in New York while Pellin's band was touring. Rodriguez is the first of three children for the couple. As a child, Rodriguez was always surrounded by musical instruments and by personalities from the music world. He wanted to become a musician like his father, but his father objected because he wanted Pedro to get a college education. The family settled in the city of Bayamón, Puerto Rico. There, young Pedro started to become more interested in the field of science than in the field of music. During his school years, he excelled in the subjects of math and science. In 1971, Rodriguez graduated from La Salle High School with honors.

Rodriguez enrolled in the University of Puerto Rico at Mayagüez and changed majors four times before deciding to become an engineer. He earned a bachelor's degree in mechanical engineering in 1976. That same year, recruiters from NASA were conducting interviews at the campus. He was hired by NASA as an engineer, designing special test equipment at the Marshall Space Flight Center in Alabama. Since then, Rodriguez has held several positions at NASA.

== Career in NASA ==
Rodriguez enrolled in the University of Alabama in Huntsville to pursue a master's degree. While pursuing his master's degree, Rodriguez moved to Florida and worked on jet engines for NASA contractor Pratt & Whitney, a United Technologies company. He earned his master's degree in mechanical engineering in 1982. In 1997, he earned his doctorate in civil engineering, from the University of Mississippi.

Rodriguez was the leader of the Solid Rocket Booster accident investigation team following the Space Shuttle Columbia accident in February 2003 and was also the project manager for the Space Launch Initiative program. After 32 years with NASA, Marshall Space Flight Center and serving in various senior leadership positions, including the Director of the test laboratory in the Engineering Directorate at NASA's Marshall Space Flight Center, and Assistant to the Chief Engineer, Rodriguez retired from NASA. Shortly after retirement he joined a small technology company in Huntsville Alabama, Victory Solutions, Inc. as Senior Vice President for Space Systems and Chief Technology Officer. In these roles he is responsible for developing new technologies and supporting company growth in highly technical engineering support services.

== Written works ==
- "On the analytical determination of relaxation modulus of viscoelastic materials by Prony's interpolation method" (1986) Document ID: 19870008022; Report Number: NAS 1.1586579, NASA-TM-86579
- "Application Of Prony's Method To Data On Viscoelasticity" (1988) Document ID: 19880000452; Report Number: MFS-27179
- "On the design of structural components using materials with time-dependent properties" (1993) Document ID: 19940012046; Report Number: NAS 1.15108428, NASA-TM-108428
- "AXAF hypervelocity impact test results" (1997) Document ID: 19980005952
- "Introduction Aims and Requirements of Future Aerospace Vehicles" (2001) Document ID: 20010020951
- "MPLM On-Orbit Interface Dynamic Flexibility Modal Test" (2001) Document ID: 20010020953

== Awards and recognitions ==
Among the awards and recognitions bestowed upon Rodriguez are: NASA's Exceptional Service Medal, NASA Inventors Award for the invention of the portable, battery-operated lift seat for people suffering from knee arthritis, the Silver Snoopy Award, and The Marshall Center Directors Commendation Award as "Outstanding Hispanic Employee". The Puerto Rican Senate recognized Rodriguez with a resolution marking his engineering achievement.

== Personal life ==
Rodriguez is a member of the American Institute of Aeronautics and Astronautics and of the American Society of Civil Engineers. He currently resides in Huntsville, Alabama.
