= Angulo =

Angulo (de Angulo, De Angulo) is a surname, and may refer to:

- Gonzalo de Angulo, Spanish prelate
- Alberto Angulo (born 1970), Spanish basketball player
- Álex Angulo (1953–2014), Spanish actor
- Alfredo Angulo (born 1982), Mexican boxer
- Brayan Angulo (footballer, born 1989) (born 1989), Colombian footballer
- Carlos Angulo (born 1980), Colombian footballer
- Carlos José Iturgaiz Angulo (born 1965), Spanish politician
- Diego Angulo Íñiguez (1901–1986), Spanish art historian
- Gilbert de Angulo (1195–1213), Anglo-Irish knight
- Guillermo Billinghurst Angulo (1851–1915), Peruvian politician
- Igor Angulo (born 1984), Spanish footballer
- Jacinto Angulo Pardo, Cuban politician
- Jaime de Angulo (1887–1950), Spanish linguist, novelist, and ethnomusicologist
- James Angulo (born 1974), Colombian retired footballer
- Jocelyn de Angulo, Anglo-Norman knight
- Jesús Ricardo Angulo (born 1997), Mexican football winger
- Jesús Alberto Angulo (born 1998), Mexican football defender
- Juan Camilo Angulo (born 1988), Colombian footballer
- Julio Angulo (born 1990), Ecuadorian footballer
- Lucio Angulo (born 1973), Spanish basketball player
- Luis Fernando De Angulo (born 1952), Colombian board director
- Marco Angulo (2002–2024), Ecuadorian footballer
- Marvin Angulo (born 1986), Costa Rican footballer
- Miguel Ángel Angulo (born 1977), Spanish footballer
- Miles de Angulo (1245–1259), Anglo-Irish knight and baron
- Nilson Angulo (born 2003), Ecuadorian footballer
- Pedro Angulo (died 1561), Spanish Dominican missionary
- Richard Angulo (born 1980), American football tight end
- Teresa Pizarro de Angulo (1930–2000), Colombian beauty pageant director and farmer
- Vinicio Angulo (born 1988), Ecuadorian footballer
- Yolanda Barcina Angulo (born 1960), Spanish politician
- Angulo brothers, subject of the documentary film The Wolfpack

== See also ==
- Ângulo, Paraná, Brazil
