= Jamby El Favo =

Puerto Rican rapper, singer and songwriter

- Born: Jan Omar Cambero Luciano; February 3, 1995 (age 31); Carolina, Puerto Rico
- Origin: Santurce, Puerto Rico
- Genres: Latin trap, Hip hop
- Occupations: Singer, songwriter
- Works: Underrated, Diamante en Bruto, Flow Futurama, Vol. 2
- Years active: 2015–present

Jan Omar Cambero Luciano, known by his stage name Jamby El Favo (born February 3, 1995), is a Puerto Rican musician and songwriter born on February 3, 1995, in Carolina, Puerto Rico. He is known for his contributions to Latin trap and urban music.

== Early life ==
Jamby grew up in the Villa Palmeras neighborhood of Santurce, Puerto Rico, a place known for its vibrant urban culture. He has Dominican roots through his mother. From a young age, he was drawn to music and frequently participated in freestyle rap battles with friends. These early experiences helped him develop his lyrical and improvisational skills.

== Career ==
Jamby began his career in 2015 by sharing music on YouTube. His early songs, including "Contigo Me La Vivo" and "En Disney", gained popularity and helped him build a following. His music video for "Contigo Me La Vivo" received over 10 million views, showing his rising influence in the music industry.

Over time, he collaborated with other Latin artists, such as Ele A El Dominio, on tracks like "Perdóname Dios". These collaborations helped him grow his presence in the Latin music scene.

== Discography ==
Jamby has released several albums and singles:

- Albums:
  - Underrated
  - Diamante en Bruto
  - Flow Futurama, Vol. 2

- Popular Singles:
  - "Persia"
  - "La Carta"
  - "Hoy"
  - "En Disney"

== Style and Influence ==
Jamby's music often reflects his personal experiences and the realities of urban life. He mixes traditional hip-hop with modern trap elements, creating music that appeals to a wide audience. His background, growing up in Puerto Rico and having Dominican roots, has shaped his musical style.
