= Ramón Merino Loo =

Mexican politician (born 1960)

- Born: 15 February 1960 (age 66); Guanajuato, Mexico
- Occupation: Politician
- Political party: PAN

Ramón Merino Loo (born 15 February 1960) is a Mexican politician from the National Action Party (PAN). In the 2009 mid-terms, he was elected to the Chamber of Deputies to represent Guanajuato's 14th district during the 61st session of Congress.
