= Pellín Rodríguez =

Puerto Rican singer

- Born: Pedro Rodríguez de Gracia; December 4, 1926; Santurce, Puerto Rico
- Died: October 31, 1984 (Aged 57) San Juan, Puerto Rico
- Genres: Salsa
- Occupation: Salsa singer
- Years active: 1942-1984
- Labels: Verne, MGM, Fania, Columbia, Rivoli, Brunswick, Rainbow, GNP, GEMA, EGC, Borinquen Records, Velvet, Calidad, El Combo Del Ayer, Top Ten Hits

Pellín Rodríguez (December 4, 1926 – October 31, 1984) was a Salsa singer. Rodríguez was a member of the musical group El Gran Combo and toured with them all over Latin America and Europe, gaining fame and popularity as a singer. In addition to his singing capabilities, Rodríguez had great comedic abilities and participated on comedy bits on various TV shows in Puerto Rico.

== Early life ==
Pellín Rodríguez (born Pedro Rodríguez de Gracia ) was born and raised in Santurce, a sector of San Juan, the capital city of Puerto Rico. His parents, Tomasita De Gracia and Zenón Rodríguez, were poor and Rodríguez was only able to complete his primary education. He had to work in various jobs in order to help his family financially. During his adolescence, Rodríguez demonstrated his musical talents singing in church and in plays at school. He was related to Gilberto Concepción de Gracia, the principal founder of the Partido Independentista Puertorriqueño (Puerto Rican Independence Party), or PIP.

== Musical career ==
=== Early years ===
Rodríguez started his musical career in 1942 when he joined Leopoldo Salgado's Conjunto Moderno. Soon after Rodríguez joined Johnny Seguí's Dandies Del 42 followed by a short stint with Orquesta Carmelo Díaz Soler. Rodríguez also played with Moncho Usera's orchestra, Manuel "Canario" Jiménez quartet, Mario Dumont's orchestra, Rafael Muñoz orchestra and Rafael Elvira's Orquesta Tropicana where he shared vocal duties with Gilberto Monroig.

In 1947 Rodríguez was hired by Noro Morales to join his orchestra. During the late 1940s and early 1950s Rodríguez also played with Xavier Cugat, José Curbelo and Tito Puente in prestigious dancing venues in New York City such as the Palladium Ballroom, Paramount Theater and China Doll Club.

In 1954 Rodríguez recorded several singles with Alfred Levy's band (Alfredito And His Orchestra) which were later compiled on a few EPs and LPs.

Rodríguez has two writing credits on the songs Saoco and "El Mantequero", both recorded by Cortijo Y Su Combo between the late 50s and early 60s.

Rodríguez moved to Chicago in the mid-1950s, where he joined Orquesta Nuevo Ritmo de Cuba, led by Armando Sánchez.

In 1960 Rodríguez moved to Puerto Rico and played with Rafael Elvira's Super Orquesta Tropicana later followed by a short stint with Noro Morales Orchestra before joining El Gran Combo.

=== El Gran Combo ===
In 1962 after Cortijo Y Su Combo disbanded, some of its members got together and founded El Gran Combo. Rodríguez joined them and shared vocal duties with Andy Montañez.

Rodríguez toured with the group all over Europe and Latin America, gaining fame and popularity as a singer. Rodríguez was the lead singer for more than 100 songs with El Gran Combo and recorded over 20 studio albums with them. Rodríguez also appears on over 20 compilations of the group.

During his decade with El Gran Combo, the group enjoyed commercial success and received several awards and international recognitions. Among them a couple of Gold Records.

In September 1972 El Gran Combo released the album Por El Libro. It was Rodríguez last studio recording with the group. During rehearsals for their upcoming record, En Acción, the leader of El Gran Combo, Rafael Ithier found out that Rodríguez had signed a contract with Borinquen Records. Rodríguez told Ithier that he was going to record an album of Boleros and that he was going to continue singing Guarachas with El Gran Combo. Ithier felt that was not a good idea and was not willing to take that risk of having Rodríguez as a member of the band and as a solo artist at the same time. Ithier suggested that Rodríguez should leave the band and Rodríguez left to pursue a solo career.

=== Solo Artist (Borinquen Records) ===
External audio
- You may listen to Pellin Rodríguez sing Amor Por Ti on YouTube

Rodríguez first solo album with Puerto Rico-based music label Borinquen Records, Amor Por Tí, was recorded in two weeks and released in April 1973. The album was a commercial success earning Rodríguez a Gold Record award and the single of the same name earned a Platinum Record award. During the time Rodríguez was signed to Borinquen Records, he recorded six studio albums and he also participated on several compilation albums for the label. Most of the arrangements and orchestration of Rodríguez music while he was at Borinquen Records were done by Bobby Valentín and his band.

=== Nuestra Orquesta La Salsa Mayor ===
In 1978 several musicians that had left Oscar D'León Salsa Mayor asked Rodríguez to join their band. Rodríguez accepted and moved to Venezuela. The new band went by the name of Nuestra Orquesta La Salsa Mayor. For their first album Rodríguez shared lead vocals duties with Leo Pacheco and Carlos El Grande (Calixto Ferrer Pérez). In 1979 they released a second album where Rodríguez shared lead vocals duties with Leo Pacheco and Freddy Nieto who replaced Carlos El Grande.

=== Andy & Pellín ===
After two albums with Nuestra Orquesta La Salsa Mayor, Rodríguez left the band and joined forces with his old partner from El Gran Combo Andy Montañez to record a new album. In 1979 they released the album "Encuentro Cercano De Dos Grandes" Andy & Pellín. The lead track of the album (Alacrán) was a direct response to a snide remark made in an El Gran Combo song released after Montañez left El Gran Combo.

=== Reflexiones Pasadas ===
In 1981 Rodríguez recorded his last studio album as a solo artist, Reflexiones Pasadas. The album was produced and directed by renowned pianist and arranger Jorge Millet. It was the last album Millet worked on before he died.

=== El Combo Del Ayer ===
In 1982 under the initiative of Johnny "El Bravo" López, a few ex-members from El Gran Combo reunited to form a group by the name of El Combo Del Ayer. Among them were Pellín Rodríguez, Elías Lopes, Roberto Roena, Milton Correa & Martín Quiñónez. They released three studio recordings and toured extensively between 1982 and 1984. The group disbanded after Rodríguez died in October 1984.

== Personal life ==
While on tour in New York, Rodríguez met a young lady who worked as a secretary for the American Express Company by the name of Elba López Pérez. Rodríguez and Elba were married in 1951 and in 1953, they had their first child, in New York, whom they named Pedro. The family was constantly on the go and in 1954 Elba gave birth to their second child, Michael, in Puerto Rico. In the late 1950s Rodríguez moved with his family to Chicago and Elba gave birth to their third son, Tommy (who followed in Pellin's footsteps and became a salsa singer). In 1960, Rodríguez moved with his family to Puerto Rico. Rodriguez and his wife bought a house in the city of Bayamón.

In June 1984, just a few months before his passing, Rodríguez had a concert in Puerto Rico where he celebrated his 45th anniversary in the music business. A few songs from this concert appear on the album Los 45 Años De Pellín Rodríguez.

Rodríguez died on October 31, 1984, in San Juan, Puerto Rico, after suffering a stroke at the age of 57. Before he died, he had the pleasure of witnessing the graduation of his first born, Pedro Rodriguez, who earned a master's degree in mechanical engineering from the University of Alabama in Huntsville while working in NASA. Pedro became the director of a test laboratory at NASA and invented a portable, battery-operated lift seat for people suffering from knee arthritis. Rodríguez is survived by his wife Elba, his sons Pedro, Michael, Tommy.

Rodríguez is buried in the San José Cemetery in Villa Palmeras, Santurce, Puerto Rico.

== Legacy ==
Puerto Rico has honored the memory of Rodríguez by naming a street in Santurce after him. In the Villa Palmeras neighborhood in Santurce there is a square named "Plaza De Los Salseros" which has a statue and plaque dedicated to Pellin Rodríguez.

== Discography ==
=== Singles ===
Artist	Títle	Release Year	Record Label
Orquesta Carmelo Díaz Soler	El Gallo Miguel/Todo Fué Mentira	1946	Verne 113
Orquesta Carmelo Díaz Soler	Stop... Marcolina/En Las Papas	1946	Verne 187
Johnny Seguí	Cambiando/Baila Pollito	1949	Verne 465
Noro Morales And His Orchestra	The Peanut Vendor/My Heart At The Sweet Voice	1949	MGM Records 10407
Noro Morales And His Orchestra	El Tiempo Será/La Mulata Rumbera	1950	Verne 0529
Noro Morales And His Orchestra	Se Apellida Morales/Mambo Land	1950	Verne 0530
Johnny Seguí	El Tubo/Georgina	1950	Verne 0532
Noro Morales And His Orchestra	Me Pica La Lengua/La Policía	1951	Columbia 39220
Luisito Benjamín Y Su Ritmo	Que Bien Te Ves/Choncoli		Rivoli-102
Luisito Benjamín Y Su Ritmo	Tres Lindas Cubanas/Adorada Ilusión		Rivoli-109
Noro Morales And His Orchestra	Mambo Jombo/Mayagüez	1952	Rivoli-111
Pellín Rodríguez	Celos/Nene		Brunswick 41507
Pellín Rodríguez	A Goya Le Dió La Gripe/Rosa Linda		Brunswick 41629
Alfredito And His Orchestra	Chop Suey Mambo/Las Muchachitas Del Cha Cha Cha	1954	Rainbow 243
Alfredito And His Orchestra	Cha Cha Cha/Tan-Tan-Tun	1954	Rainbow 247
Alfredito And His Orchestra	Turkish Delight/Sugar Cane Mambo	1954	Rainbow 255
Alfredito And His Orchestra	Temptress Mambo/Crazy Stanley Mambo	1954	Rainbow 258
Alfredito And His Orchestra	Papa Loves Mambo/Nocturnando	1954	Rainbow 264
El Gran Combo	Cabeza De Hacha/Perico	1963	GEMA-1414
El Gran Combo	Mujer Querida/Acángana	1964	GEMA-1431
El Gran Combo	A Mi Manera/Santigualo	1964	GEMA-1439
El Gran Combo	El Jala Jala/Fe Y Adoración	1964	GEMA-1450
El Gran Combo	La Rareza/Yo Bailo Merengue	1964	GEMA-1454
El Gran Combo	Lo Que Dios Me Dió/Campesino	1964	GEMA-1463
El Gran Combo	El Caballo Pelotero/El Cobrador	1965	GEMA-1465
El Gran Combo	Meneito Me/La Cara	1965	GEMA-1476
El Gran Combo	El Pasajero Cuña/Los Cuadrosos	1965	GEMA-1482
El Gran Combo	Se Acabó/El Carrito	1966	GEMA-1511
El Gran Combo	Cantares/Alegre Navidad	1966	GEMA-1515
El Gran Combo	La Vieja Voladora/ Oye Su Cantar	1966	GEMA-1516
El Gran Combo	Perejil Pa' La Cotorra/Máldito Callo	1967	GEMA-1528
El Gran Combo	Son Facilito/Pa' Que Te Desbarates	1967	GEMA-1533
El Gran Combo	Esos Ojitos Negros/Córreme Guardia	1967	GEMA-1542
El Gran Combo	Fiesta Con El Gran Combo/Primer Viaje Pa' La Luna	1967	GEMA-1551
El Gran Combo	Gran Combo's Boogaloo/Vas Bien	1967	GEMA-1560
El Gran Combo	Chua Chua Boogaloo/Shake It Baby	1967	GEMA-1566
El Gran Combo	Clap Your Hands/Avelino Plumón	1967	GEMA-1570
El Gran Combo	Tu Querías Boogaloo ? ¡Toma Boogaloo!/Sway To And Fro	1967	GEMA-1577
El Gran Combo	Navidades A Go Go/Shing A Ling For My Baby	1967	GEMA-1583
El Gran Combo	Pata Pata/Voy	1967	GEMA-1589
El Gran Combo	El Jala Jala Llegó/Transplante De Corazón	1967	GEMA-1595
El Gran Combo	De Que Presumes/En Un Beso La Vida	1968	GEMA-1601
El Gran Combo	La Mazucamba/Gran Combo Jala-Jala	1968	GEMA-1607
El Gran Combo	Good Night My Love/Cinnamon	1968	GEMA-1627
El Gran Combo	A Tí Te Pasa Algo/Mi Ritmo	1968	GEMA-1647
El Gran Combo	Chango Ta' Veni/Le Dicen Papá	1971	EGC-7005
El Gran Combo	Gracias Mi Amor/Apreciemos La Ocasión	1973	GEMA-1709
Pellín Rodríguez	Amor Por Tí/Arrebatadora	1973	Borinquen D-400
Pellín Rodríguez	Prepárate Corazón/Que Extraña Es La Vida	1973	Borinquen D-414
Pellín Rodríguez	Lechón A La Varita/No Vuelvas Navidad	1973	Borinquen D-418
Pellín Rodríguez	Rompamos El Contrato/Vuelve Otra Noche	1973	Borinquen D-427
Pellín Rodríguez	Quémame Los Ojos/La Mata De Tomate	1974	Borinquen D-433
Pellín Rodríguez	Óyeme Locutor/Déjame No Vuelvas Mas	1974	Borinquen D-446
Pellín Rodríguez	El Fó/Navidad En Panamá	1974	Borinquen D-456
Pellín Rodríguez	Voy A Cambiar Mi Corazón/Me Dices Que Te Vas	1975	Borinquen D-458
Pellín Rodríguez	Recordar Es Morir/Se Vende Un Corazón	1975	Borinquen D-477
Pellín Rodríguez	Capricornio Y Tauro/Sopa De Bacalao	1975	Borinquen D-487
Pellín Rodríguez	Brindo Por Tu Cumpleaños/Una Sola Estrella	1976	Borinquen D-506
Pellín Rodríguez	A Los Muchachos De Belén/Aventurera	1976	Borinquen D-516
Andy Montañez & Pellín Rodríguez	Alacrán/Alma Libre	1979	Velvet PRS-2483
Pellín Rodríguez	Muñeco/No Te Dejaré	1981	KLS-101
El Combo Del Ayer	El Viento Me Dá/En Un Beso La Vida	1983	CA 103
El Combo Del Ayer	Ojos Chinos/Maribel	1983	
El Combo Del Ayer	Plaza Vacante/La Rareza	1984	TTH-1870

=== EPs & LPs ===
Artist	Títle	Release Year	Record Label
Noro Morales And His Orchestra	Rhumba With Noro Morales And His Orchestra	1949	MGM Records E-537
Alfredito And His Orchestra	Cha Cha Cha - Mambo (4 Track EP)	1954	Rainbow EP-614
Alfredito And His Orchestra	Cha Cha Cha Mambo	1954	Rainbow LP 720
Alfredito And His Orchestra	Mambos For Dancing (4 Track EP)	1955	Rainbow EP-618
Alfredito And His Orchestra	Mambos For Dancing	1955	Rainbow LP 721
Orquesta Nuevo Ritmo De Cuba	The Heart Of Cuba	1959	GNP 47
El Gran Combo	De Siempre	1963	GEMA-1181
El Gran Combo	Acángana	1964	GEMA-1188
El Gran Combo	Ojos Chinos, Jala Jala	1964	GEMA-1195
El Gran Combo	El Caballo Pelotero	1965	GEMA-3001
El Gran Combo	El Swing De El Gran Combo	1966	GEMA-3011
El Gran Combo	En Navidad	1966	GEMA-3021
El Gran Combo	Máldito Callo	1967	GEMA-3027
El Gran Combo	Esos Ojitos Negros	1967	GEMA-3030
El Gran Combo	Fiesta Con El Gran Combo	1967	GEMA -3035
El Gran Combo	Boleros Románticos	1967	GEMA-3036
El Gran Combo	Boogaloos	1967	GEMA-3044
El Gran Combo	¿Tu Querias Boogaloo? ¡Toma Boogaloo!	1967	GEMA-3052
El Gran Combo	Pata-Pata, Jala-Jala, Boogaloo	1967	GEMA-3057
El Gran Combo	Tangos Por El Gran Combo	1968	GEMA-3061
El Gran Combo	Los Nenes Sicodélicos	1968	GEMA-3066
El Gran Combo	Latin Power	1968	GEMA-3074
El Gran Combo	Smile! It's El Gran Combo	1968	GEMA-3078
El Gran Combo	Este Si Que Es, 1969	1969	GEMA-3083
El Gran Combo	Estamos Primeros	1970	RCSLP 1911
El Gran Combo	De Punta A Punta	1971	RCSLP 1912
El Gran Combo	Por El Libro	1972	RCSLP 1913
Pellín Rodríguez	Amor Por Tí	1973	Borinquen SDG-1244
Pellín Rodríguez	La Salsa De Borinquen En Navidad Volumen II (Various Artists)	1973	Borinquen ADG-1248
Davilita, Felipe Rodríguez Y Pellín Rodríguez Con El Sexteto Borinquen	Navidad	1973	Borinquen SDG-1250
Pellín Rodríguez	Quémame Los Ojos	1973	Borinquen ADG-1254
Davilita, Felipe Rodríguez Y Pellín Rodríguez Con El Sexteto Borinquen	La Protesta De Los Reyes	1974	Borinquen ADG-1262
Pellín Rodríguez	Album 3	1974	Borinquen AAD-1270
Pellín Rodríguez	La Salsa Es De Borinquen En La Navidad Vol.4 (Various Artists)	1974	Borinquen SDG-1273
Pellín Rodríguez	Recordar Es Morir	1975	Borinquen ADG-1285
Pellín Rodríguez	De Parranda En Navidad	1975	Borinquen ADG-1288
Pellín Rodríguez	Aventurera	1976	Borinquen ADG-1304
Nuestra Orquesta La Salsa Mayor	...De Frente y Luchando...!	1978	Velvet LPV-1787
Nuestra Orquesta La Salsa Mayor	Un Sello De Garantía	1979	Velvet LPV-8023
Andy Montañez & Pellín Rodríguez	"Encuentro Cercano De Dos Grandes" Andy & Pellín	1979	Velvet PRS-3002
Pellín Rodríguez	Reflexiones Pasadas	1981	Calidad Records KLP-101
El Combo Del Ayer	El Encuentro	1983	CA001
El Combo Del Ayer	Aquel Gran Encuentro	1983	CA 002
El Combo Del Ayer	20 Años Después...El Pasado Convertido En Presente...	1984	Top Ten Hits TTH-1870
Pellín Rodríguez	Los 45 Años De Pellín Rodríguez	1985	Recuerdos Record LPR-129

=== Compilations (EPs & LPs) ===
Artist	Títle	Release Year	Record Label
Manuel Jimenez Y Su Cuarteto	Glorias de Puerto Rico: Vol. 2	2000	Seeco 9110
Noro Morales And His Orchestra	Rhumbas And Mambo	1993	Tumbao Cuban Classics TCD-027
Noro Morales And His Orchestra	"Live" Broadcasts & Transcriptions 1942–48	1996	Harlequin HQCD78
Noro Morales And His Orchestra	25 Versiones Clásicas De El Manicero (Various Artists)	1997	Tumbao Cuban Classics TCD-801
Noro Morales And His Orchestra	Walter Winchell Rumba	2000	MLCD-55025
Noro Morales And His Orchestra	Mambo With Morales: The Complete Columbia Masters	2006	MHCP1098
Noro Morales And His Orchestra	Vereda Tropical 36 Masterpieces of South America 1933-1956 (Various Artists)	2007	FA 5176
Alfredito And His Orchestra	Cha Cha Cha Mambos Merengue	1956	Rainbow LP-120
Alfredito And His Orchestra	Mambos Cha Cha Cha	1956	Rainbow LP-121
Alfredito And His Orchestra	Teenagers Dance Chop Suey Mambo (4 Track EP)	1958	RCA Victor EPA-4201
Alfredito And His Orchestra	Crazy Titles For Dancing Cha Cha & Merengue	1958	RCA Victor LPM-1695
Alfredito And His Orchestra	Mambologia Pa' Gozar Vol. 3 (Various Artists)	2012	Rareza Music 900234
Orquesta Nuevo Ritmo De Cuba	The Heart Of Cuba/The Incendiary Piano of Peruchin!	2000	GNP Crescendo Records GNPD 2264
El Gran Combo	Merengues	1969	GEMA SE-COL-026
El Gran Combo	Guarachas	1969	GEMA SE-COL-027
El Gran Combo	Bombas	1969	GEMA SE-COL-028
El Gran Combo	Epócas De Oro	1969	GEMA SE-COL-029
El Gran Combo	Sus 15 Grandes Hits Vol.1	1969	GEMA SE-COL-031
El Gran Combo	Aquí Está Pellín Sus Mejores Boleros	1973	GEMA LPG-5013
El Gran Combo	Los Años De Andy Montañez Con El Gran Combo	1978	GEMA LPGS-5057
El Gran Combo	Recordando A Pellín Rodríguez Con Sus 15 Grandes Éxitos	1984	GEMA G-044
El Gran Combo	25th Anniversary	1987	RCSLP 2050–3
El Gran Combo	20 Grandes Éxitos	1990	Discos Fuentes D16040
El Gran Combo	15 Grandes Hits Vol.2	1992	Disco Hit 1509
El Gran Combo	30 Aniversario	1992	Combo CO-2091
El Gran Combo	15 Grandes Hits Vol.3	1993	Disco Hit 1510
El Gran Combo	The Best	1995	Sony CDZ-81476
El Gran Combo	16 Boleros	1996	Discos Fuentes D16476
El Gran Combo	35 Years Around The World	1997	Combo-2125
El Gran Combo	Clásicos De Puerto Rico 24 Canciones Románticas De Siempre (Various Artists)	1999	Disco Hit 8196
El Gran Combo	Clásicos De Puerto Rico Vol. 9 (Various Artists)	1999	Disco Hit 8266
El Gran Combo	30 Éxitos Remasterizados	2000	Discos Fuentes E20007
El Gran Combo	Los 40 De	2002	Disco Hit 5001
El Gran Combo	Los Tres Grandes El Gran Combo, Los Condes & Felipe Rodriguez (Various Artists)	2005	Disco Hit 1807
El Gran Combo	Encantos Del Bolero (Various Artists)	2006	Ole Music 972012
El Gran Combo	From The Beginning 45 Years Of Music (1962–2007) Remixed And Remastered Original Recordings	2008	Combo CO-2145
El Gran Combo	46 Aniversario Toda Una Historia	2008	Discos Fuentes E20386
El Gran Combo	It's Christmas Time! 15 Greatest Hits	2010	Combo CO-2141
El Gran Combo	Estrellas De Fuentes: Salsa (Various Artists)	2011	Discos Fuentes E20386
Pellín Rodríguez	La Salsa Es De Borinquen Vol.1 (Various Artists)	1973	Borinquen ADG-1245
Pellín Rodríguez	La Salsa Es De Borinquen Vol.3 (Various Artists)	1974	Borinquen SDG-1268
Pellín Rodríguez	La Salsa Es De Borinquen Vol.5 (Various Artists)	1975	Borinquen ADG-1280
Pellín Rodríguez	20 Estrellas Y Sus Éxitos (Various Artists)	1981	Borinquen AAA-1427
Pellín Rodríguez	15 Éxitos Bailables De Navidad (Various Artists)	1983	Borinquen DDD-1461
Pellín Rodríguez	Homenaje A Pellín Rodríguez Epoca De Oro Sus 15 Éxitos	1984	Borinquen ADG-1494
Pellín Rodríguez	15 Éxitos De Salsa (Con Sus Interpretes Originales) Epoca De Oro (Various Artists)	1986	
Pellín Rodríguez	Lo Mejor De La Salsa Vol 2 (Various Artists)		Borinquen
Pellín Rodríguez	Historia Musical Sus Grandes 20 Éxitos	1993	DG-1540
Pellín Rodríguez	12 Boleros Colección De Oro	1999	DG-1579
Pellín Rodríguez	La Salsa Es De Borinquen Vol.1 (Various Artists)		Borinquen CDB 5001
Pellín Rodríguez	La Salsa Es De Borinquen Vol.3 (Various Artists)		Borinquen CDB 5005
Pellín Rodríguez	20 Éxitos Navideños La Salsa De Borinquen (Various Artists)	2001	DG-1248
Pellín Rodríguez	Navidad Lo Mejor De Pellín Rodríguez	2008	DG-1288
Pellín Rodríguez	Diamantes de la Salsa Vol. 2 (Various Artists)	2006	Colmusica CDC-2136
Pellín Rodríguez	Victoriosos Salseros Puro Clásico (Various Artists)	2006	Colmusica CDC-2137
Nuestra Orquesta La Salsa Mayor	Grandes Exitos De: La Salsa Mayor "Lo Mejor De Lo Mejor"		Velvet C-D- 404040
Nuestra Orquesta La Salsa Mayor	Los Años De Oro Velvet Salsa All Stars (Various Artists)	1999	Velvet-5278
Nuestra Orquesta La Salsa Mayor	40 Años De Éxitos	2007	Velvet-4007
Nuestra Orquesta La Salsa Mayor	Antologia De La Salsa (Various Artists)	2006	Yoyo Music 21082
Nuestra Orquesta La Salsa Mayor	16 Salsa Con Estilo (Various Artists)	2006	Union Records 900129
Andy Montañez	40 Años De Éxitos	2010	Velvet-4086
El Combo Del Ayer	Joyas De La Salsa Vol 3 (Various Artists)	2000	Top Ten Hits TTH 01-44-39-02731
El Combo Del Ayer	Los Éxitos De Pellin Rodríguez Con El Combo Del Ayer	2003	AJ 1378

== See also ==
- List of Puerto Ricans
- Dr. Pedro Rodriguez
