= 14th federal electoral district of Guanajuato =

Federal electoral district of Mexico

Guanajuato's 14th
- Electoral district of the Chamber of Deputies of Mexico

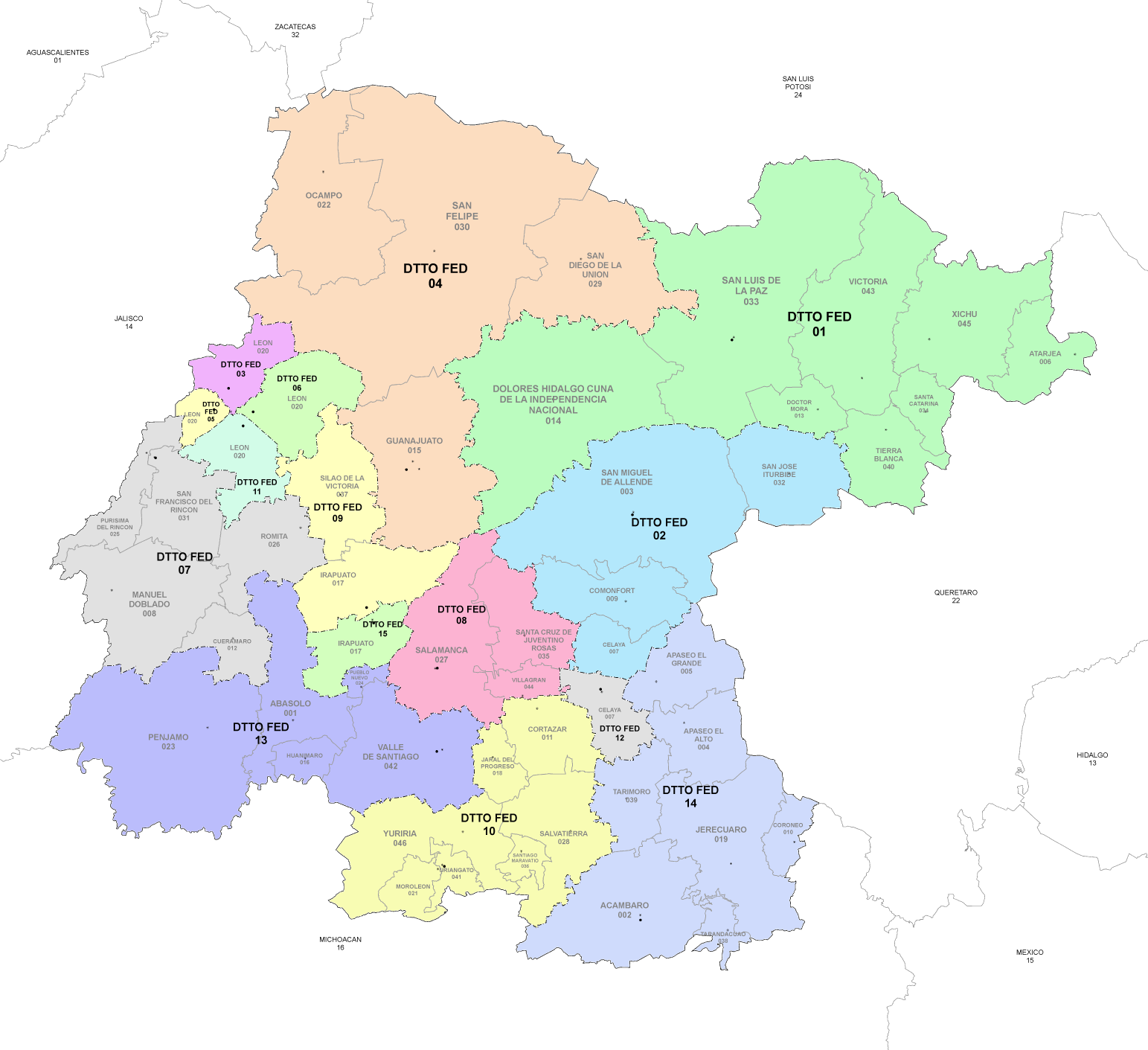
- 14th district since 2017

Incumbent
- Member: Juana Acosta Trujillo
- Party: ▌Morena
- Congress: 66th (2024–2027)

District
- State: Guanajuato
- Head town: Acámbaro
- Coordinates: 20°02′N 100°44′W
- Covers: 7 municipalities: Acámbaro, Apaseo el Alto, Apaseo el Grande, Coroneo, Jerécuaro, Tarandacuao, Tarimoro
- PR region: Second
- Precincts: 289
- Population: 397,931 (2020 census)

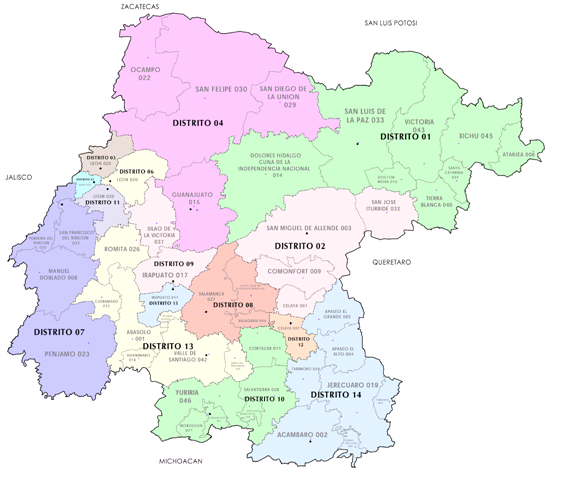
Guanajuato's districts in 2017–2022

The 14th federal electoral district of Guanajuato (Spanish: Distrito electoral federal 14 de Guanajuato) is one of the 300 electoral districts into which Mexico is divided for elections to the federal Chamber of Deputies and one of 15 such districts in the state of Guanajuato.

It elects one deputy to the lower house of Congress for each three-year legislative session by means of the first-past-the-post system. Votes cast in the district also count towards the calculation of proportional representation ("plurinominal") deputies elected from the second region.

Suspended in 1930, (Note: An amendment to Article 52 of the Constitution in 1928 changed the original provision of "one deputy per 60,000 inhabitants" to "one deputy per 100,000"; as a result, the size of the Chamber of Deputies fell from 281 in the 1928 election to 171 in 1934.) Guanajuato's 14th was re-established by the Federal Electoral Institute (IFE) in its 1996 redistricting process. The restored district returned its first deputy in the 1997 mid-term election.

The current member for the district, elected in the 2024 general election, is Juana Acosta Trujillo of the National Regeneration Movement (Morena).

== District territory ==
Under the 2023 districting plan adopted by the National Electoral Institute (INE), which is to be used for the 2024, 2027 and 2030 federal elections, the 14th district covers the south-east of Guanajuato and comprises 289 electoral precincts (secciones electorales) across seven of the state's 46 municipalities:

- Acámbaro, Apaseo el Alto, Apaseo el Grande, Coroneo, Jerécuaro, Tarandacuao and Tarimoro .

The head town (cabecera distrital), where results from individual polling stations are gathered together and tallied, is the city of Acámbaro. The district reported a population of 397,931 in the 2020 census.

== Previous districting schemes ==
Evolution of electoral district numbers
	1974	1978	1996	2005	2017	2023
Guanajuato	9	13	15	14	15	15
Chamber of Deputies	196	300				

2017–2022

Between 2017 and 2022, the 14th district had the same configuration as in the 2023 scheme.

2005–2017

Under the 2005 plan, Guanajuato had only 14 districts. This district's head town was at Acámbaro and it covered six municipalities: the same group as in the later plans except for Tarimoro, which was assigned to the 10th district.

1996–2005

The 1996 scheme increased Guanajuato's allocation from 13 to 15 seats. The new 14th district had its head town at Acámbaro and it comprised five municipalities:
- Acámbaro, Coroneo, Jerécuaro, Tarandacuao and Tarimoro.

== Deputies returned to Congress ==
(Mexico) National parties
- Current
- PAN
- PRI
- PT
- PVEM
- MC
- Morena
- PAZ
- Somos
- Defunct or local only
- PLM
- PNR
- PRM
- PNM
- PP
- PPS
- PARM
- PFCRN
- CON
- PANAL
- PSD
- PES
- PES
- PRD

Guanajuato's 14th district
Election	Deputy	Party	Term	Legislature
1916	Nicolás Cano		1916–1917	Constituent Congress of Querétaro
1917	Federico Montes		1917–1918	27th Congress
1918	Federico Montes	PLN	1918–1920	28th Congress
...
The 14th district was suspended between 1930 and 1997
1997	Pedro Magaña Guerrero	Party of the Democratic Revolution	1997–2000	57th Congress
2000	Fernando Ugalde Cardona	National Action Party (Mexico)	2000–2003	58th Congress
2003	Rubén Alfredo Torres Zavala	National Action Party (Mexico)	2003–2006	59th Congress
2006	Martín Malagón Ríos	National Action Party (Mexico)	2006–2009	60th Congress
2009	Ramón Merino Loo	National Action Party (Mexico)	2009–2012	61st Congress
2012	José Luis Oliveros Usabiaga	National Action Party (Mexico)	2012–2015	62nd Congress
2015	René Mandujano Tinajero	National Action Party (Mexico)	2015–2018	63rd Congress
2018	María Eugenia Espinosa Rivas	National Action Party (Mexico)	2018–2021	64th Congress
2021	Esther Mandujano Tinajero	National Action Party (Mexico)	2021–2024	65th Congress
2024	Juana Acosta Trujillo	National Regeneration Movement	2024–2027	66th Congress

== Presidential elections ==
Guanajuato's 14th district
Election	District won by	Party or coalition	%
2018	Andrés Manuel López Obrador	Juntos Haremos Historia	35.0412
2024	Claudia Sheinbaum Pardo	Sigamos Haciendo Historia	53.6470
