= Norzagaray (surname) =

Norzagaray is a Basque surname. The etymology is problematic. It originates in a neighbourhood (barrio) of that name in the municipality of Aiara, province of Álava, in Spain's Basque Country. Historical variants, no longer extant in Spain, include Norsagaray and Narzagaray.

According to one calculation, in the early 2020s, fifteen people in Spain had it as their first (traditionally paternal) surname, with another eight reporting it as the second (traditionally maternal) surname.

== People with the surname ==
- Ángel Norzagaray Norzagaray (1961–2021), a Mexican playwright, cultural promoter and academic.
- Antonio Norzagaray Ángulo (1888–1918), a Mexican army officer and politician.
- Bernardo Norzagaray Ángulo (1910–1991), a Mexican agricultural engineer and politician.
- Fernando Norzagaray y Escudero (1808–1860), a Spanish colonial official who served as governor of Puerto Rico and governor of the Philippines.

- Norzagaray, a municipality in the province of Bulacan, Philippines, named for him.
- The General Norzagaray Bridge, a barrel vault bridge built in 1855 in San Juan, Puerto Rico, also named for him.
- A street in Puerto Rico's San Juan National Historic Site also bears his name.
