= Villa Palmeras (Santurce) =

Subbarrio of Santurce in San Juan, Puerto Rico

Coordinates: 18°26′44″N 66°02′58″W

- Subbarrio
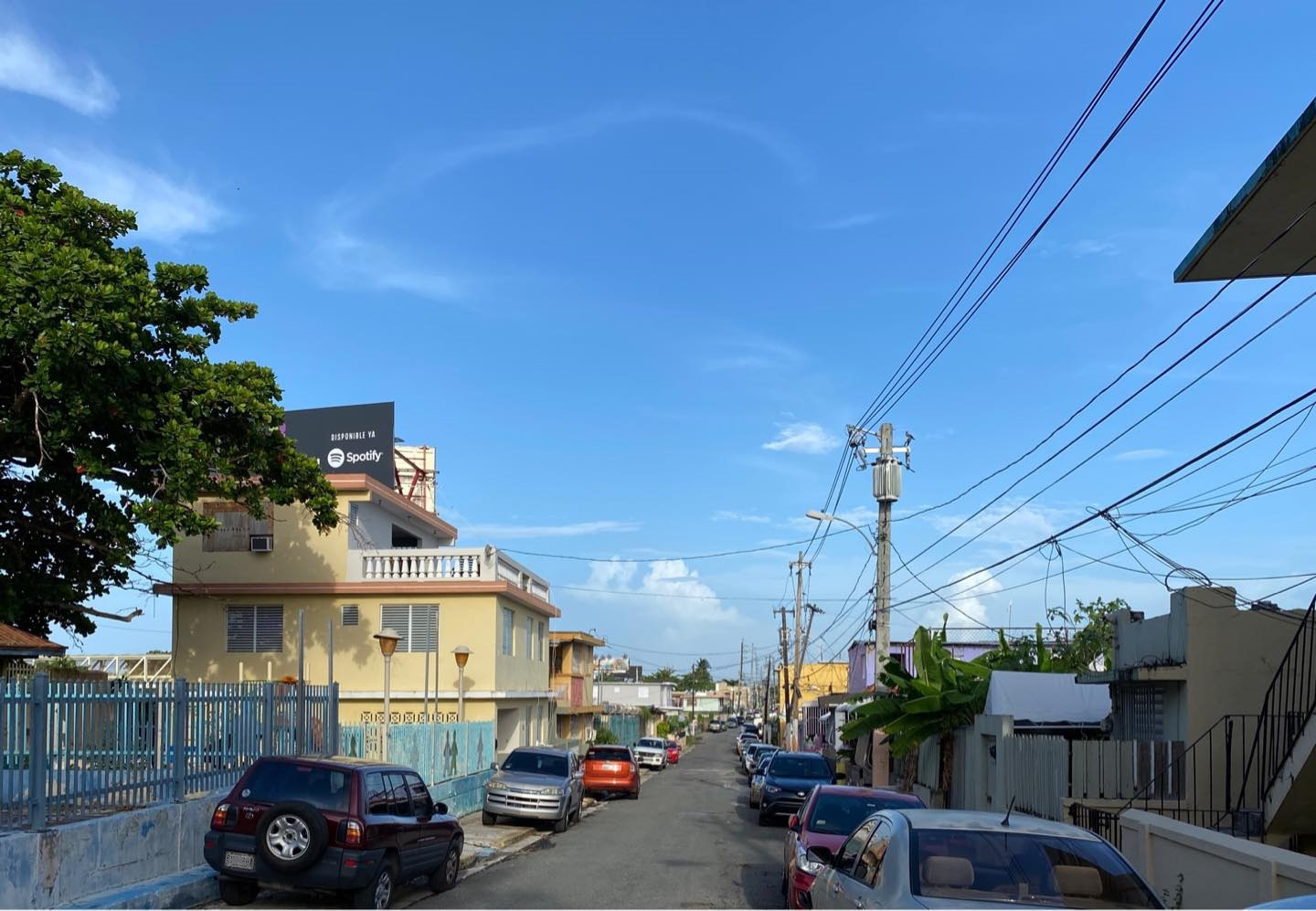
- Street, cars and homes in Villa Palmeras in 2020

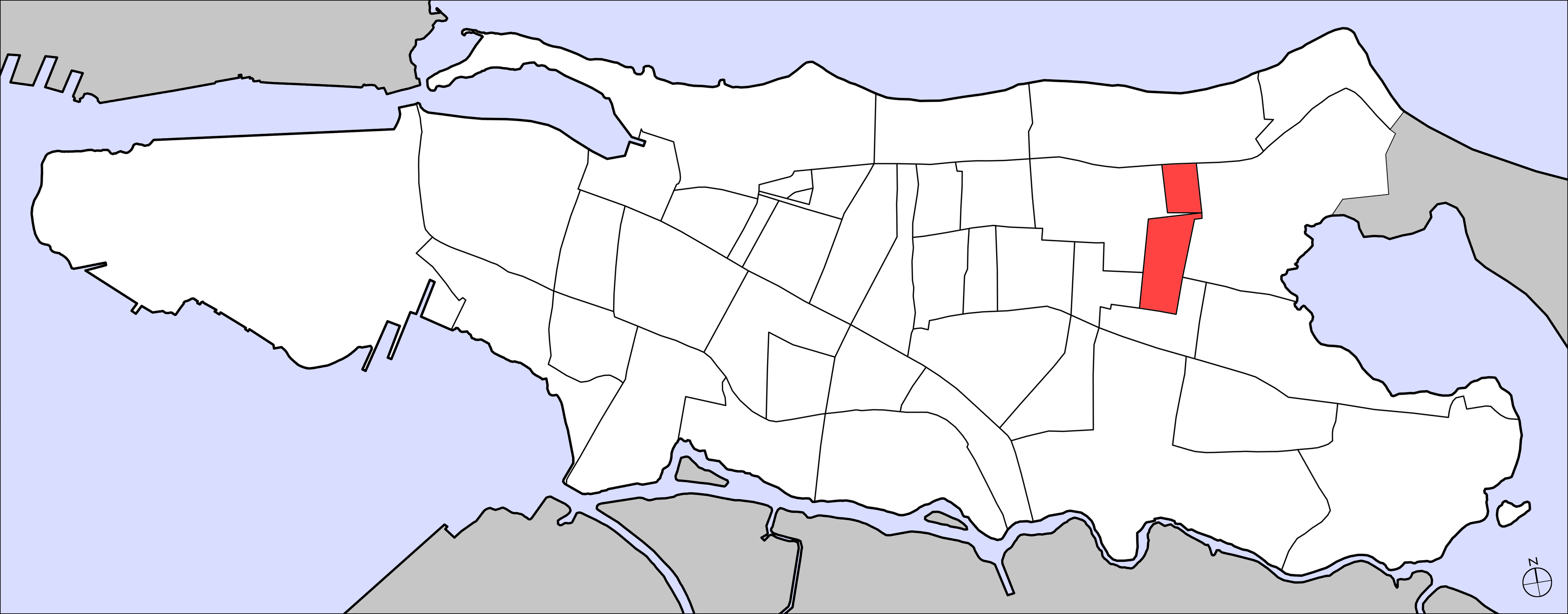
- Villa Palmeras on map of Santurce
- Commonwealth: Puerto Rico
- Municipality: San Juan
- Barrio: Santurce

Area
  - Total: .06 sq mi (0.16 km^{2})
  - Land: .06 sq mi (0.16 km^{2})
- Elevation: 0 ft (0 m)

Population (2010)
  - Total: 2,351
  - Density: 39,183.3/sq mi (15,128.8/km^{2})
- Source: 2010 Census
- Time zone: UTC−4 (AST)

Villa Palmeras is one of the forty subbarrios of Santurce, a barrio of San Juan, Puerto Rico.

== Demographics ==
In 1940, Villa Palmeras had a population of 2,939.

In 2000, Villa Palmeras had a population of 2,648.

In 2010, Villa Palmeras had a population of 2,351 and a population density of 39,183.3 persons per square mile.

Pedro Pierluisi created a political campaign video with residents of Villa Palmeras when he was running for governor in 2015.

The municipality of San Juan provided economic incentives to businesses in Villa Palmeras in the 2010s.

== San José Cemetery ==
The San José Cemetery in Villa Palmeras is the final resting place of many famous Puerto Rican musicians including Rafael Cepeda, Pellín Rodríguez, Tommy Olivencia, Rafael Cortijo, Ismael Rivera and Sammy Ayala of El Gran Combo.

== Gallery ==
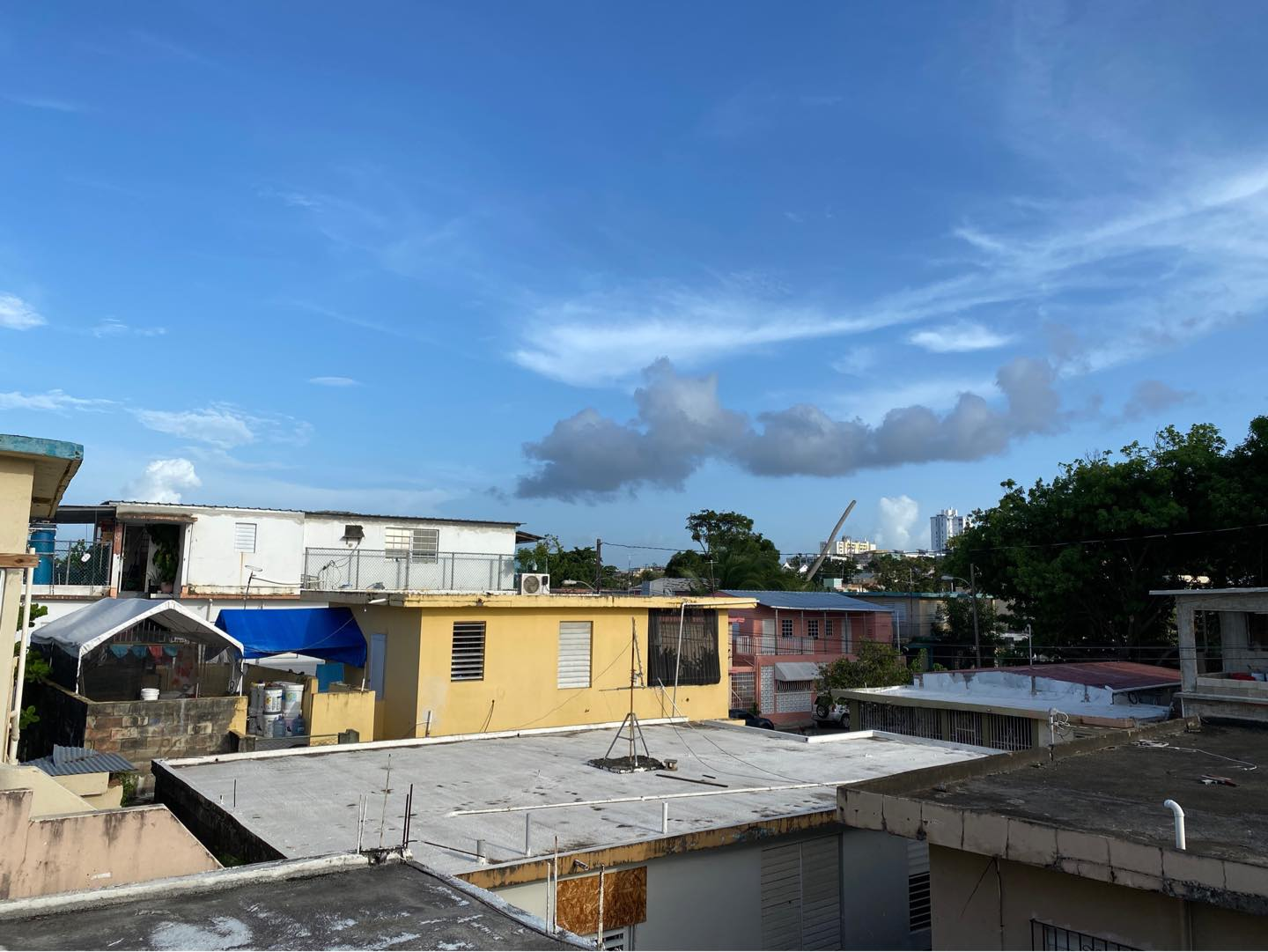
Villa Palmeras homes view from atop a home

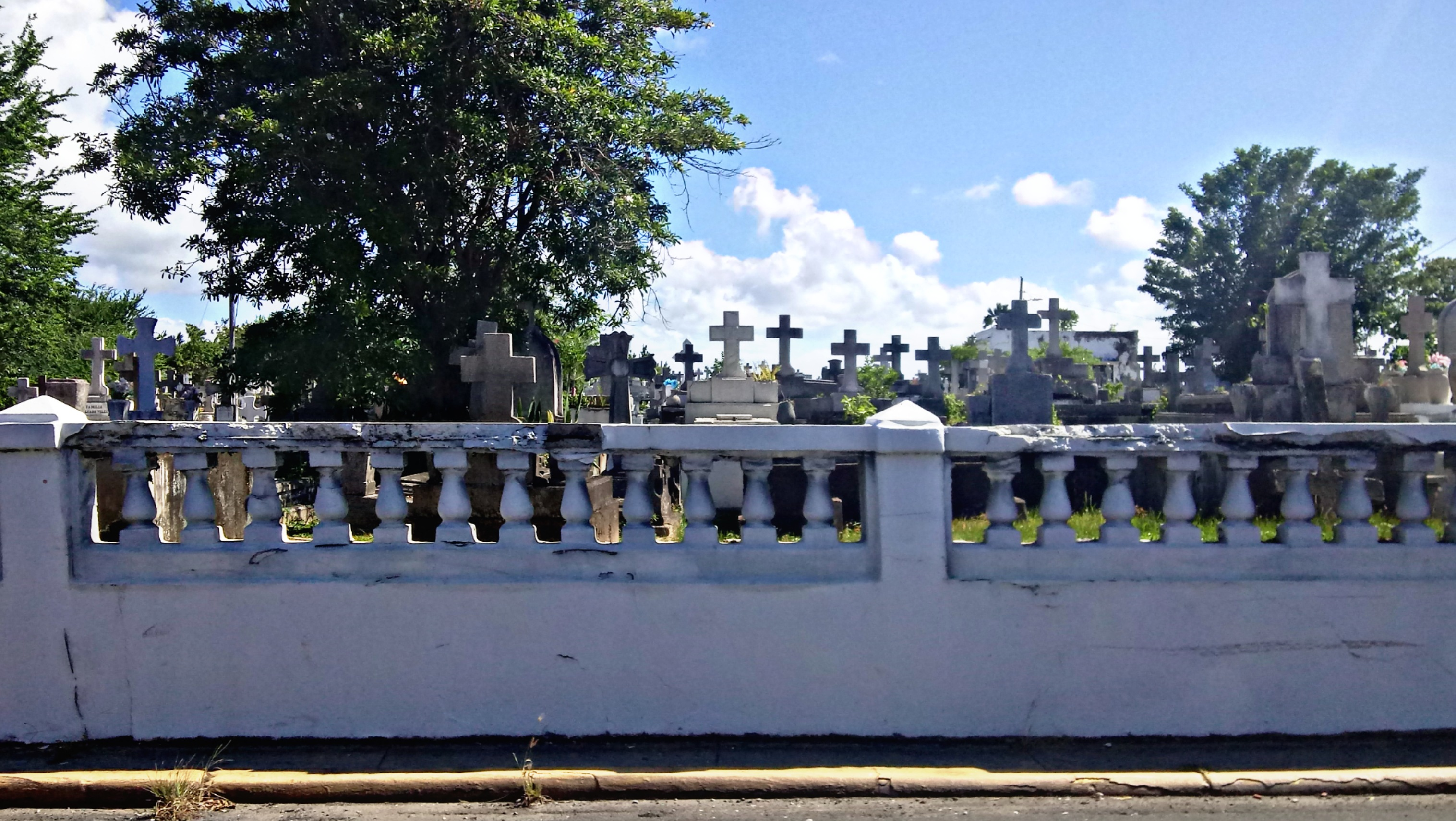
San José Cemetery

== See also ==
- List of communities in Puerto Rico
