= Sinaloa de Leyva =

Town in the Mexican state of Sinaloa

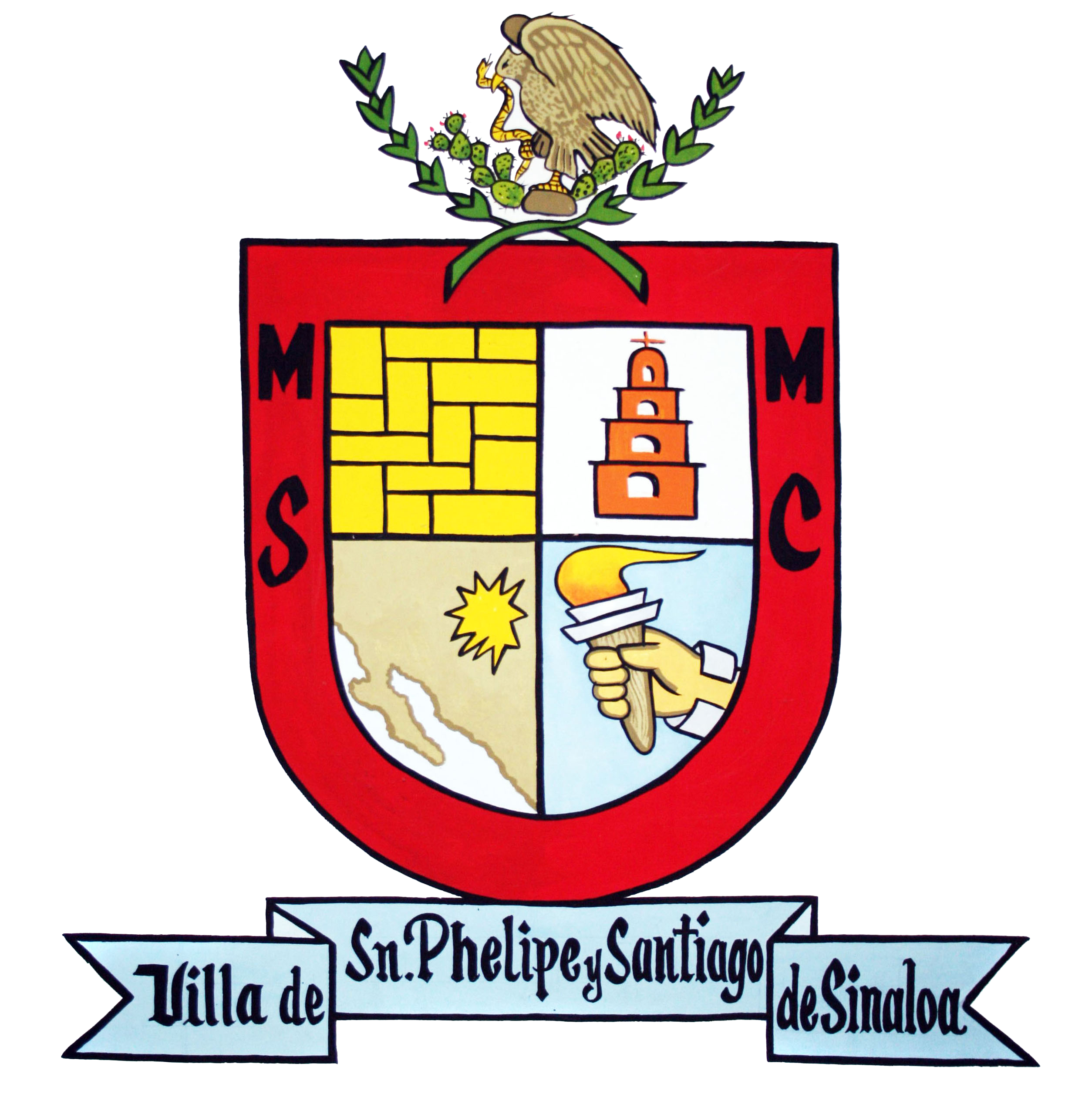
- Seal

- Location in Mexico
- Coordinates: 25°36′25″N 107°33′18″W
- Country: Mexico
- State: Sinaloa
- Municipality: Sinaloa
- Founded in: 1583
- Founded by: Pedro de Montoya
- Elevation: 80 m (260 ft)

Population (2010)
  - Total: 5,240
- Time zone: UTC-7 (Mountain Standard Time)
- Website: Official website

Sinaloa de Leyva (Spanish pronunciation: [sinaˈloa ðe ˈlejβa]) is a town in the Mexican state of Sinaloa. Its geographical location is 25°36′25″N 107°33′18″W. The honorific "de Leyva" commemorates Gabriel Leyva Solano, an early supporter of Francisco I. Madero in the Mexican Revolution who was born there. Sinaloa serves as the municipal seat for the surrounding municipality (municipio) of Sinaloa, Sinaloa. The municipality reported 88,282 inhabitants in the 2010 census. It is a former capital of the state of Sinaloa.

== History ==
The town was founded on 30 April 1583 as Villa de San Felipe y Santiago de Sinaloa by Don Pedro de Montoya. In 1585 the second foundation of the town was carried out by Antonio Ruiz, Bartolomé de Mondragón, Tomás de Soberanes, Juan Martínez del Castillo y Juan Caballero. By 1590, Ruiz was its mayor, and the town was home to nine people who eked out a living, but the situation improved through their discovery of the mines of Chínipas, and the arrival of the Jesuit missionaries Gonzalo de Tapia and Martín Pérez in 1591. At the end of the sixteenth century, Ruiz wrote an autobiography where he detailed the early history of San Felipe y Santiago, and Sinaloa.

In 1595, Luis de Velasco granted residents' petitions for a presidio at San Felipe y Santiago, and Diego Fernández de Velasco (governor) dispatched Captain Alonso Díaz with 24 soldiers to found it. The presidio of Sinaloa was the northwesternmost in New Spain until the 1689 founding of the Presidio de Fronteras.

This was the base for Diego de Hurdaide's subjugation of the Sinaloas, Tehuecos, Ahomes and Zuaques and the extension of Spanish control over the Fuerte River valley, and thus to the northern edge of modern Sinaloa.
