= Guadalajara train disaster =

Deadly 1915 train derailment in western Mexico

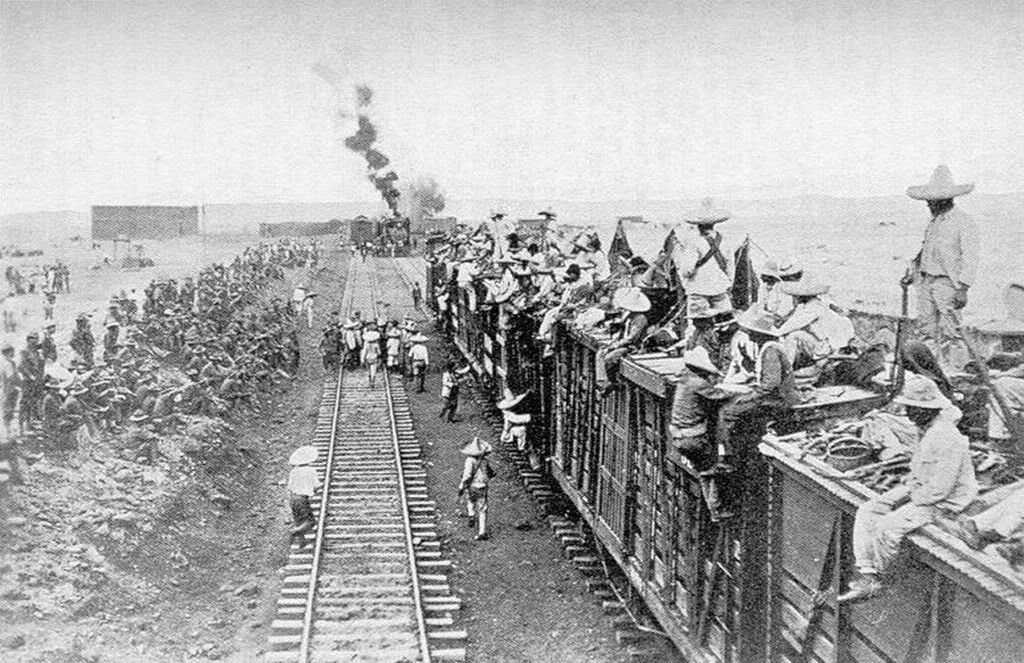
- A picture of the train before the disaster

Details
- Date: January 22, 1915; 111 years ago
- Location: Guadalajara
- Country: Mexico
- Line: Colima to Guadalajara
- Incident type: Derailment
- Cause: Brake failure

Statistics
- Trains: 1
- Passengers: 900
- Deaths: 600+

The Guadalajara train disaster occurred in the Mexican state of Jalisco on January 22, 1915, and killed over 600 people.

The Mexican Revolution was in full swing by 1915. After the assassination of Francisco Madero two years earlier, the presidency of the country was assumed by Victoriano Huerta, but revolutionary forces led by Venustiano Carranza and Pancho Villa overthrew him and Carranza became president in 1914. Villa however wanted to continue the revolution and an armed struggle ensued. On January 18, 1915, Carranza's troops captured Guadalajara in western Mexico. He immediately ordered that the families of his troops be transported by train from Colima on the Pacific coast to his newly captured stronghold.

On January 22, 1915, a special train of twenty cars left Colima. It was packed, with people even clinging to the roofs and undercarriages. After entering the state of Jalisco, between Ciudad Guzmán and Sayula, the engineer lost control on a long steep descent. As the train gathered speed many people were thrown off as the train negotiated curves. Eventually the entire train plunged off the tracks and into a deep canyon, with fewer than 300 of the 900 on board surviving the disaster. Some of Carranza's troops, Yaqui Indians, committed suicide when hearing of the death of their families. Others swore vengeance on the train crew, but they had also been killed in the disaster.

The tragedy remains the deadliest railway accident in North American history.
