= Luis Fernando De Angulo =

Colombian businessman

Luis Fernando de Angulo (born September 29, 1952 in Bogotá, Colombia) was the director of Corporate Social Responsibility for Occidental Petroleum Corporation starting September 2004. He led the implementation of the Human Rights Policy and the Voluntary Principles, along with the risk assessment and training tools required by the social responsibility function.

De Angulo graduated from the Civil Engineering faculty of the Universidad de Los Andes in Bogotá, Colombia. He joined Occidental Petroleum after a two-year scholarship at the Weatherhead Center for International Affairs at Harvard University, where he co-directed the Colombia Civil Society Initiative. His involvement in the Colombia Initiative is preceded by 22 years of experience leading and managing public participation processes, regional development projects, business, community, and government partnerships, as well as organizing nonprofit networks for local and regional development.
