= Francisco Javier Gaxiola =

Mexican lawyer, politician and diplomat

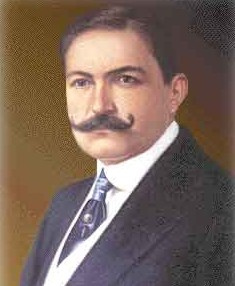

Governor of the State of Mexico
- In office September 11, 1919 – March 8, 1920 (acting)
- President: Venustiano Carranza
- Preceded by: Agustín Millán Vivero
- Succeeded by: Agustín Millán Vivero

Personal details
- Born: January 31, 1870 Sinaloa de Leyva
- Died: November 18, 1933 (aged 63) Mexico City
- Profession: lawyer, politician, diplomat

Francisco Javier Gaxiola Castillo-Negrete (January 31, 1870 – November 18, 1933) was a Mexican lawyer, politician and diplomat.

Gaxiola was born in Sinaloa de Leyva, and taught in superior-level institutions of law in the Estado de México. As a diplomat, he was adviser to the Legation of Mexico in Madrid. From September 11, 1919, to March 8, 1920, he was acting Governor of the State of Mexico, while Agustín Millán Vivero, the original governor, accompanied President Venustiano Carranza, when the rebellion in Agua Prieta exploded. He died in Mexico City, aged 63.

== Publications ==
- El General Antonio Rosales : revista histórica del estado en Sinaloa de 1856 a 1865, 1894
- Gobernantes del estado de México; Muzquiz-Zavala-Olaguíbel, 1899

== Decorations ==
- Commander of the Orden de Isabel la Católica
- Commander of the Spanish Red Cross (Spanish: Cruz Roja Española)
