= Rubén Alfredo Torres Zavala =

Mexican politician (born 1968)

- Born: 14 September 1968 (age 57); Guanajuato, Mexico
- Occupation: Politician
- Political party: PAN

Rubén Alfredo Torres Zavala (born 14 September 1968) is a Mexican politician affiliated with the National Action Party (PAN). In the 2003 mid-terms, he was elected to the Chamber of Deputies to represent Guanajuato's 14th district during the 59th session of Congress.
