= Eduardo Usabiaga y Llaguno =

Cuban diplomat

Cuban ambassador to Chile of Cuba to Chile
- In office 1925–1928
- Preceded by: José Vidal y Caro
- Succeeded by: Manuel de León y Valdés

Envoy Extraordinary and Minister Plenipotentiary of Cuba to the Czechoslovak Republic
- In office October 27, 1928 – 1930

Cuban ambassador to France of Cuba to France
- In office 1933–1935
- Preceded by: Ricardo Herrera Guirol
- Succeeded by: Francisco Domínguez Roldán

Personal details
- Born: 1891
- Died: 1973 (aged 81–82)
- Spouse: Rosa Llaguno
- Education: studied law at the University of Havana.

Eduardo Usabiaga y Ocharán (1891–1973) was a Cuban diplomat.

== Career ==
- After high school he moved to the United States, where he learned English and French and devoted himself to his business.
- On June 17, 1925 he joined the Foreign Service.
- From 1925 to 1928 he was Envoy Extraordinary and Minister Plenipotentiary of Cuba in Santiago de Chile.
- From 1928 to 1930 he was Envoy Extraordinary and Minister Plenipotentiary in Prague with concurrent accreditation in Warsaw, Bucharest and Belgrade in the Kingdom of Serbs Croats and Slovenes.
- In 1931 he was Under Secretary of State in the Ministry of Cuba.
- In 1932 he was Chief of Protocol in Havana.
- From 1933 to 1935 he was Envoy Extraordinary and Minister Plenipotentiary in Paris.
