= Ahomes =

Indigenous group of the Fuerte River

The Ahomes were a native people living around the mouth of the Fuerte River at the time they first came into contact with the Spanish. The Ahomes were brought under Spanish military control and Jesuit religious leadership from 1600 to no later than 1609, and largely were merged into the culture of New Spain after this time.

== Sources ==
- Spice, Edward H. Cycles of Conquest. Tucson: University of Arizona Press, 1962.
