= José Luis Oliveros Usabiaga =

Mexico politician (born 1983)

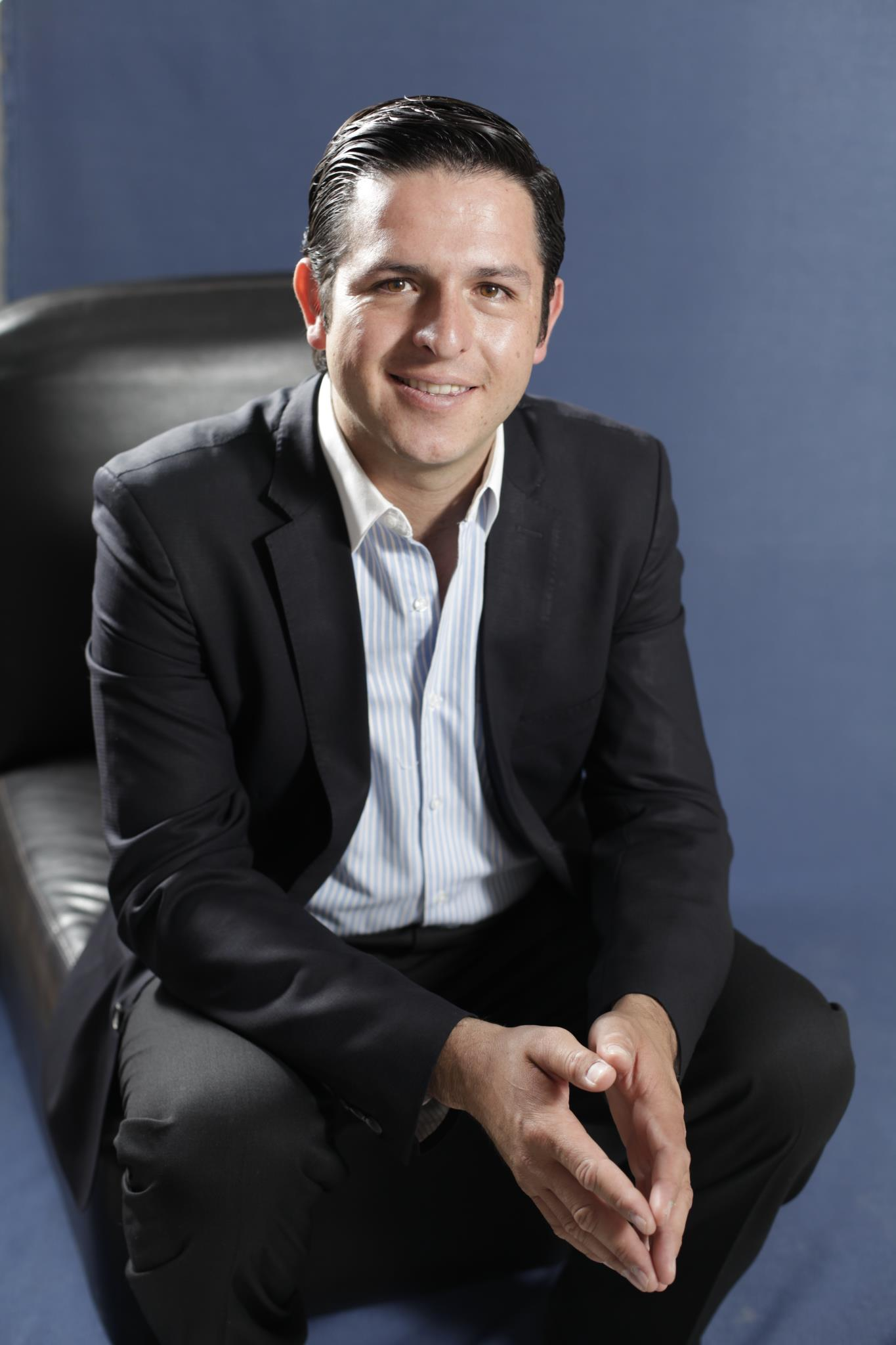
- Born: 8 May 1983 (age 43); Apaseo el Grande, Guanajuato, Mexico
- Occupation: Politician
- Political party: PAN

José Luis Oliveros Usabiaga (born 8 May 1983) is a Mexican politician affiliated with the National Action Party (PAN). In the 2012 general election, he was elected to the Chamber of Deputies to represent Guanajuato's 14th district during the 62nd session of Congress.
