= Teodoro Elizondo =

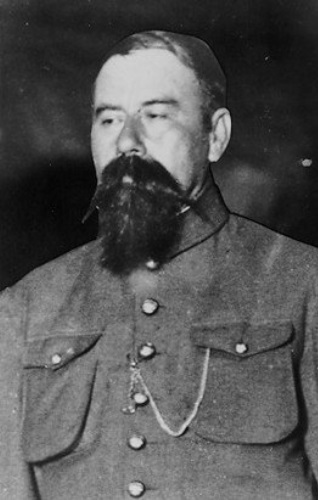
Teodoro Elizondo

Teodoro Elizondo González or Teodoro Elizondo Bustos (November 9, 1862 – April 26, 1936) was a Mexican general who participated in the Mexican Revolution.

== Biography ==
He was born in the town of Higueras, Nuevo León on November 8, 1862. In 1891, he settled in Sierra Mojada, Coahuila, where he established a grocery business. Antirreeleccionista and friend of the family Carranza, he participated in political campaigns from 1908 to 1911. The governor Venustiano Carranza appointed him chief of weapons of Sierra Mojada. For two years he defended that area from the orozquistas attacks.

When proclaiming the Plan de Guadalupe, he organized a game with people recruited in Sierra Mojada and with family and friends from his native Higueras. He joined the forces of Jesus Carranza Garza in 1913 and campaigned in the northwest of the country with the rank of lieutenant colonel. He attended the capture of Ciudad Victoria, Tamaulipas, in November 1913; to Monterrey in April 1914 and Tampico to the following month.

To the fall of Huertismo, he was appointed military commander of Querétaro. Marciano Gonzalez Villarreal represented him in the Convention of Aguascalientes, and although this assembly appointed him governor of the queretana entity on November 25, 1914, he chose to remain faithful to constitutionalism. He fought Villismo in the center of the country in 1915.

He received the rank of brigadier general with antiquity of March 15, 1918.

He died in Mexico City on April 26, 1936.

== Notes and references ==
=== Bibliography ===
- Naranjo, Francisco (1935). Diccionario biográfico Revolucionario (Imprenta Editorial "Cosmos" edición). México.
