= Ignacio Alcocer =

Mexican politician (1870–1936)

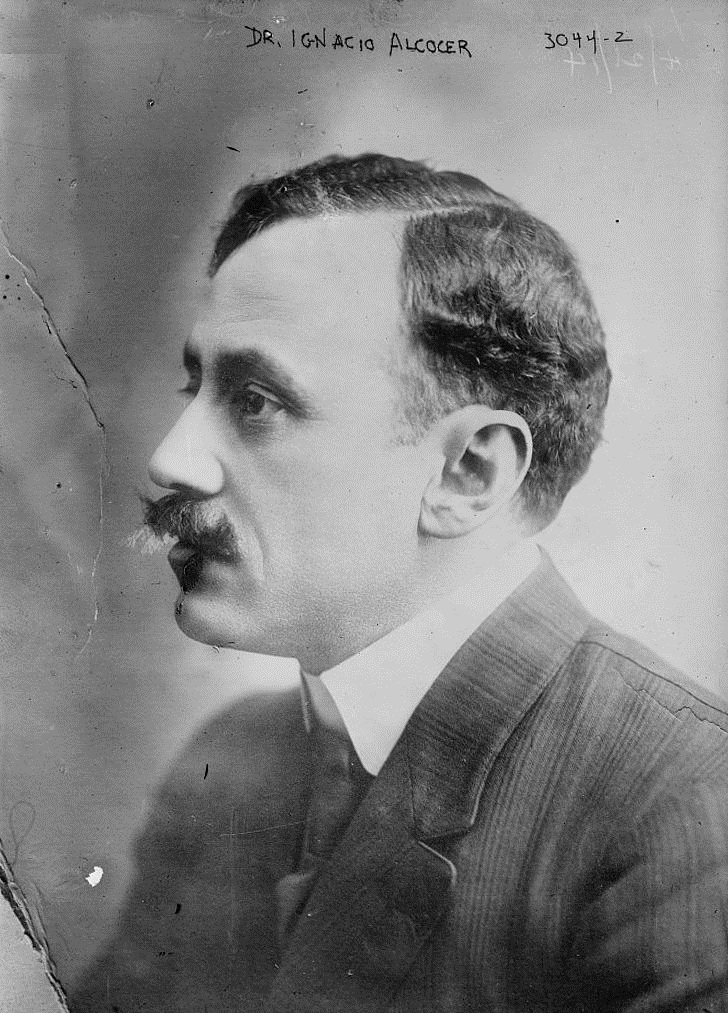

Ignacio Alcocer Rodríguez (1870 – 1936) was the Governor of Coahuila from 13 April to November 1913, taking over from Venustiano Carranza. He was also Secretary of the Interior from 1913 to 1914.

He was trained as a medical doctor, before going into politics and business.

Dr. Alcocer c. 1913

== See also ==
- Politics of Mexico
- Secretariat of the Interior
