= Agustín Millán Vivero =

Mexican politician and general (1878–1920)

Agustín Millán
- President: Venustiano Carranza

Governor of Veracruz
- In office October 15, 1915 – 1916
- Preceded by: Cándido Aguilar Vargas
- Succeeded by: Cándido Aguilar Vargas

Governor of the State of Mexico
- In office June 30, 1917 – September 6, 1918
- In office March 4, 1919 – September 11, 1919
- In office March 8, 1920 – May 13, 1920
- Preceded by: Carlos Tejada
- Succeeded by: Darío López (interim)

Personal details
- Born: July 24, 1879 Texcaltitlán
- Died: March 18, 1920 (aged 40)
- Party: Partido Antirreeleccionista

Military service
- Rank: Brigadier General

Agustín Millán Vivero (July 24, 1879 in Texcaltitlán – March 18, 1920) was a Mexican general and politician.

== Biography ==
Millán moved to Orizaba, when he was 20 years old, where he worked as a carpenter. In 1909, during the beginning revolution in Mexico, he joined the Partido Antirreeleccionista (Anti-Reelection party), and supported Francisco I. Madero. In 1913 he fought in the rank of a second lieutenant under General Cándido Aguilar (División de Oriente) against Victoriano Huerta, who substituted him temporarily as military commander and as governor of Veracruz in 1915. On June 30, 1917, in the rank of a Brigadier General, he followed Carlos Tejada as Governor of the State of Mexico, supported by the Club Democrático Progresista. During this period, he was two times absent because of military reasons. The first time, Joaquín García Luna acted in place of him from September 6, 1918, to March 4, 1919. When the rebellion in Agua Prieta exploded, he accompanied President Venustiano Carranza. At this time, Francisco Javier Gaxiola acted in place of him from September 11, 1919, to March 8, 1920. Millán became injured in the battle actions. Due to his bad physical constitution, Darío López became interim governor on March 13, a few days before Millán died in consequence of his injuries.
