= Rafael Cepeda =

Puerto Rican composer and musician (1910–1996)

Rafael Cepeda Atiles
- Patriarch of the Cepeda family

Background information
- Born: July 10, 1910; San Juan, Puerto Rico
- Died: July 21, 1996 (aged 86) Carolina, Puerto Rico
- Genres: Puerto Rican-African folk music
- Occupations: Composer, musician
- Instruments: Congas, tambourine, maracas
- Years active: 1940–1996

Rafael Cepeda Atiles (July 10, 1910 – July 21, 1996), recognized as "The Patriarch of the Bomba and Plena", was the patriarch of the Cepeda family, known internationally as ambassadors of Afro-Puerto Rican folk music.

== Early years ==
Cepeda was born in Puerta de Tierra, San Juan, Puerto Rico, to Modesto Cepeda and Leonor Atiles. His family has passed the traditional dances of the Bomba and Plena from generation to generation, as his great-grandfather, grandfather, and mother and father were all performers of the tradition. The Bomba is a music, rhythm and dance that was brought to Puerto Rico by West African slaves. The Plena is another form of Puerto Rican folkloric music of African origin. According to Cepeda, he was born while his mother Leonor was in the middle of a Bomba dance. He attended San Augustin Catholic School until the 8th grade in San Juan. After Cepeda finished 8th grade he took up amateur boxing and worked as a carpenter. During his free time he continued to practice dancing the Bomba and Plena. He also played the congas, tambourine, and maracas.

== Career ==
External audio
- You may watch and listen to Rafael Cepeda's interpretation of "Oye Rosa" here

In 1932, Cepeda married Caridad Brenes Caballero, a Bomba and Plena dancer. Together they had ten children. Cepeda decided to form a folkloric dance group with the help of his wife Caridad who would be the group's choreographer and the designer of the traditional costumes. In 1940, his first group, called "ABC", made their artistic debut in the local radio show of Rafael Quiñones Vidal "Tribuna del Arte" (Art Tribune).

In the 1940s and 1950s, Cepeda's compositions positively affected the careers of other well-respected Puerto Rican musicians, including Ismael Rivera and Rafael Cortijo.

In 1957, Cepeda formed a second folkloric group which he called "Grupo Folklorico Trapiche". This group held shows in all of the major hotels of the island and participated in the following three movies: Carnaval en Puerto Rico (Carnival in Puerto Rico, 1961), Felicia (1963) and Mientras Puerto Rico Duerme (While Puerto Rico Sleeps, 1964).

In 1973, members of the family which included his children, formed the "Ballet Folklorico de la familia Cepeda" (The Folkloric Ballet of the Cepeda Family). This new group gained international fame and participated in the 1975 film Mi Aventura en Puerto Rico (My Adventure in Puerto Rico). The group became a Puerto Rican institution, and has performed in the United States, South and Central America, Europe and Asia. The Government of Puerto Rico named Cepeda "The Patriarch of the Bomba and Plena" in recognition of his contributions to the island's African musical culture.

== Later years ==
In 1977, Modesto Cepeda, son of Rafael, founded the Rafael Cepeda Atiles School of Bomba and Plena which is located at Calle Union #71, sector Playita de Villa Palmeras in Santurce, San Juan, Puerto Rico. The school teaches the youth of Puerto Rico the fundamentals of the traditional dances. Cepeda's wife Caridad died on February 25, 1994. Rafael Cepeda died from a heart attack on July 21, 1996, in the city of Carolina, Puerto Rico. He is buried (with his wife) in the San José Cemetery in Villa Palmeras.

== Legacy ==
Jesus Manuel Cepeda, son of Rafael, founded the Cultural Folkloric Foundation Rafael Cepeda (Fundacion Folklorica Cultural Rafael Cepeda). In 1997, the family inaugurated The House Museum Rafael Cepeda. In his honor the Institute of Puerto Rican Culture established the Rafael Cepeda Festival of Bomba and Plena which is annually celebrated in San Juan. His granddaughter, Margarita "Tata" Cepeda, continues to preserve and promote the traditional Afro-Puerto Rican music and dance forms of bomba and plena.

== Recordings ==
Cepeda wrote and recorded over 500 pieces. Among those are the following:

- "El Bombon de Elena"
- "A Bailar Bambule"
- "Madam Calalú"
- "Mofongo Pelaó"
- "Habla Cuembé"
- "A la Verdegué"
- "Juan José"
- "Santígualo"
- "Bambulaé seá Allá"
- "Mi Goleta"
- "Mi Caela"
- "El Chivo"
- "Sobina Santos"
- "En Prueba de su Amistad"
- "Guaguaracengo"
- "La Negra Toto"
- "Vira Más"
- "Cuando el Negro se Alzó"
- "Lero de mi Lero"
- "Conde Kirico"
- "Candelario Alomar"
- "Ana Celía"
- "Anaízo"
- "Candela"
- "Zumbador"

== Awards and honors ==
Among the many awards and recognitions bestowed upon Rafael Cepeda are the following:

- 1983, the National Endowment for the Arts in Washington, D.C., awarded Cepeda with a National Heritage Fellowship, which is the United States government's highest honor in the folk and traditional arts.
- Certificate of recognition from the then President of the United States Ronald Reagan.
- In 2000 he was posthumously inducted into the International Latin Music Hall of Fame.

== See also ==
- List of Puerto Ricans
- Music of Puerto Rico
