= Federico Montes =

Mexican military officer and politician (1884–1950)

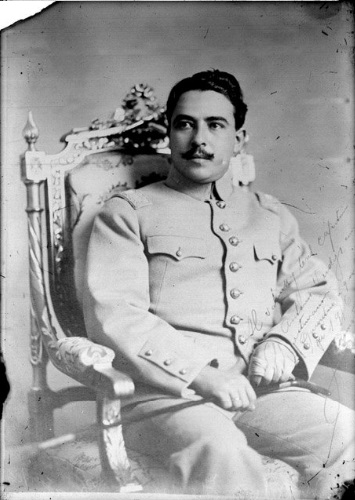
- Portrait of Federico Montes, c. 1912

Governor of Querétaro
- In office 29 July 1914 – 1 August 1914
- In office 6 May 1915 – 30 June 1917

President of the Chamber of Deputies
- In office 1 September 1918 – 31 August 1919

Governor of Guanajuato
- In office 25 September 1919 – 26 February 1920
- Preceded by: Fernando Alcocer
- Succeeded by: Toribio Villaseñor
Other offices
Member of the Presidential General Staff for Francisco I. Madero
In office June 1911 – 18 February 1913
Succeeded by	Abolished in coup
Federal Deputy for Guanajuato's 14th district
In office 1 May 1917 – 31 August 1918
Chief of Military Operations for Guanajuato, Querétaro, Michoacán
In office March 1920 – May 1920
Federal Deputy for Guanajuato's 4th district
In office 1 September 1932 – 31 August 1934
Mexico Ambassador to Colombia
In office 4 November 1941 – 1 November 1942
Preceded by	Carlos Darío Ojeda Rovira
Succeeded by	Miguel Angel Menéndez

Personal details
- Born: José Federico Ángel Francisco de Jesús Montes Alanís; October 2, 1884 San Miguel de Allende, Guanajuato, Mexico
- Died: December 1, 1950 (aged 66) Mexico City, Mexico
- Cause of death: Heart Attack
- Profession: Military General, Politician
- Military career
- Allegiance: (Mexico)
- Branch: Mexican Army
- Service years: 1905 - 1920's
- Rank: General
- Battles/wars: Mexican Revolution

Federico Montes (October 2, 1884 – December 1, 1950) was a Mexican military officer who participated in the Mexican Revolution. Montes began his political career serving on the presidential staff of Francisco I. Madero. During the 1913 coup Montes helped prevent the kidnapping of President Madero at the National Palace in February 1913 by killing two of Victoriano Huerta's rebel abductors. By the end of the Revolution, Montes was allied with Venustiano Carranza and was with him during his assassination, standing as a guard of honor at his funeral.

== Biography ==
Montes was born in San Miguel de Allende, Guanajuato, on October 2, 1884. In 1905 he entered the Military Candidate School, after which he was assigned to the regiment of light artillery; he joined in 1906 as a second lieutenant of artillery. He was promoted on March 18, 1909 to tactical artillery lieutenant, being destined to Presidential Staff, and again on September 12, 1911 to Captain second rank. Being an officer of the Federal Army, he sympathized with the emerging Maderism movement, and later joined the General Staff of President Francisco I. Madero.

In 1912, he participated in the campaign against Pascual Orozco and when it ended, he returned to the Presidential Staff. In 1913, he was arrested along with Madero and sent to a depot of commanders and officers who participated in the campaign against the Constitutionalists in the north. In late 1913, Montes adhered to the Constitutionalists in Nuevo León with the rank of major.

In February 1914, Montes was promoted to lieutenant colonel after fighting the Huerta forces in the state of Tamaulipas. In May, he took part in the assault of Tampico, and on July 29 in the creation of Querétaro, where he served as acting governor and military commander. On August 1, he participated in making Celaya, rising to colonel. He fought later that year against Pancho Villa's forces in Tampico as a brigadier general.

On May 6, 1915, Montes held the governorship of Querétaro again. He fought Brigadier General Rodolfo Fierro in Mariscala, recovering the city of Querétaro. In 1917 he was deputy for the state of Guanajuato and in 1919 was elected governor of Guanajuato. In 1920 he became head of military operations in the states of Querétaro, Guanajuato and Michoacán. He was commander of the 1st, 11th, 17th and 28th Military Zones.

Montes was the President of the Chamber of Deputies in 1918. In 1941, he was appointed Mexico's ambassador to Colombia. He died in Mexico City on December 1, 1950, when he was commander of the Legion of Mexican Honor.
