= Aurelio L. González =

Mexican revolutionary and politician (1860–1927)

Governor of Aguascalientes
- In office 10 June 1917 – 4 May 1920

Delegate to the 1916–17 Constitutional Convention for Aguascalientes's 1st district
- In office 1 December 1916 – 5 February 1917

Personal details
- Born: 17 September 1860 San Juan de los Lagos, Jalisco, Mexico
- Died: 29 July 1927 (aged 66) Federal District, Mexico
- Occupation: Politician

Aurelio L. González (17 September 1860 – 29 July 1927) was a Mexican supporter of the Constitutionalists in the 1910–1917 Revolution. He represented Aguascalientes at the 1916–17 Constitutional Convention in Querétaro and was later elected governor of Aguascalientes.

== Life ==
Aurelio González was born in San Juan de los Lagos, Jalisco, on 17 September 1860. His early years were spent in his home town but his family later moved to the city of Aguascalientes. He was a supporter of Francisco I. Madero at the outbreak of the Mexican Revolution and, following Madero's February 2013 assassination, of Venustiano Carranza. (Note: Carranza and González were, additionally, compadres.)

In the 1916 election to the Constitutional Convention in Querétaro, convened by Carranza, González was elected to represent Aguascalientes's 1st district. On 3 January 1917, however, for health reasons, he requested a leave of absence from his duties and he did not sign the newly enacted Constitution on 5 February 1917. (Note: Neither did Archibaldo Eloy Pedroza, the alternate representative for Aguascalientes's 1st.)

In elections organised by interim governor Antonio Norzagaray and held on 13 May 1917, González was elected to serve as governor of Aguascalientes, a position that he held from 10 June 1917 to 4 May 1920. As governor, he enacted the new constitution of the state of Aguascalientes on 6 September 1917.

At the end of his gubernatorial mandate, González withdrew from public life and returned to his trading business. He died in Mexico City on 29 July 1927.
