= Ramón F. Iturbe =

Politician of Sinaloa

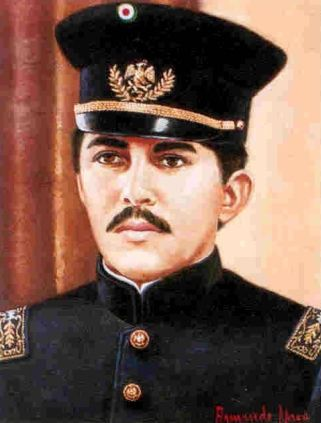
- Portrait of Ramón F. Iturbe

Governor of Sinaloa
- In office July 26, 1917 – 1920
- Preceded by: Ignacio Leandro Pesqueira Gallego
- Succeeded by: Eliseo Quintero Quintero

Personal details
- Born: Ramón Fuentes Iturbe; November 7, 1889 Mazatlán
- Died: October 27, 1970 (aged 80) Mexico City

Ramón F. Iturbe (November 7, 1889 - October 27, 1970) was a Mexican military man and politician. He was born in Mazatlán on November 7, 1889. Since he was little he had to work to support his family. He fought in the Maderista revolution. He was Governor of Sinaloa from 1917 to 1920 and focused on social justice, as he paved the road to Altata and created the Madero Hospital. During his period of government he converted the Rosales School into the University of the West and built the Garmendia Market in Culiacán. Since taking office, it has been argued that he could not be governor because he did not meet the minimum age requirements and therefore they did not let him finish his term. In 1966, he was awarded the Belisario Domínguez Medal of Honor by the Senate of the Republic. He died at the Central Military Hospital of Mexico City on October 27, 1970, 10 days before his 81st birthday. The cause of his death was an acute non-traumatic myocardial infarction, his remains rest in the Garden Pantheon of Mexico City located in Alcaldía Álvaro Obregón.
