= Apaseo el Grande =

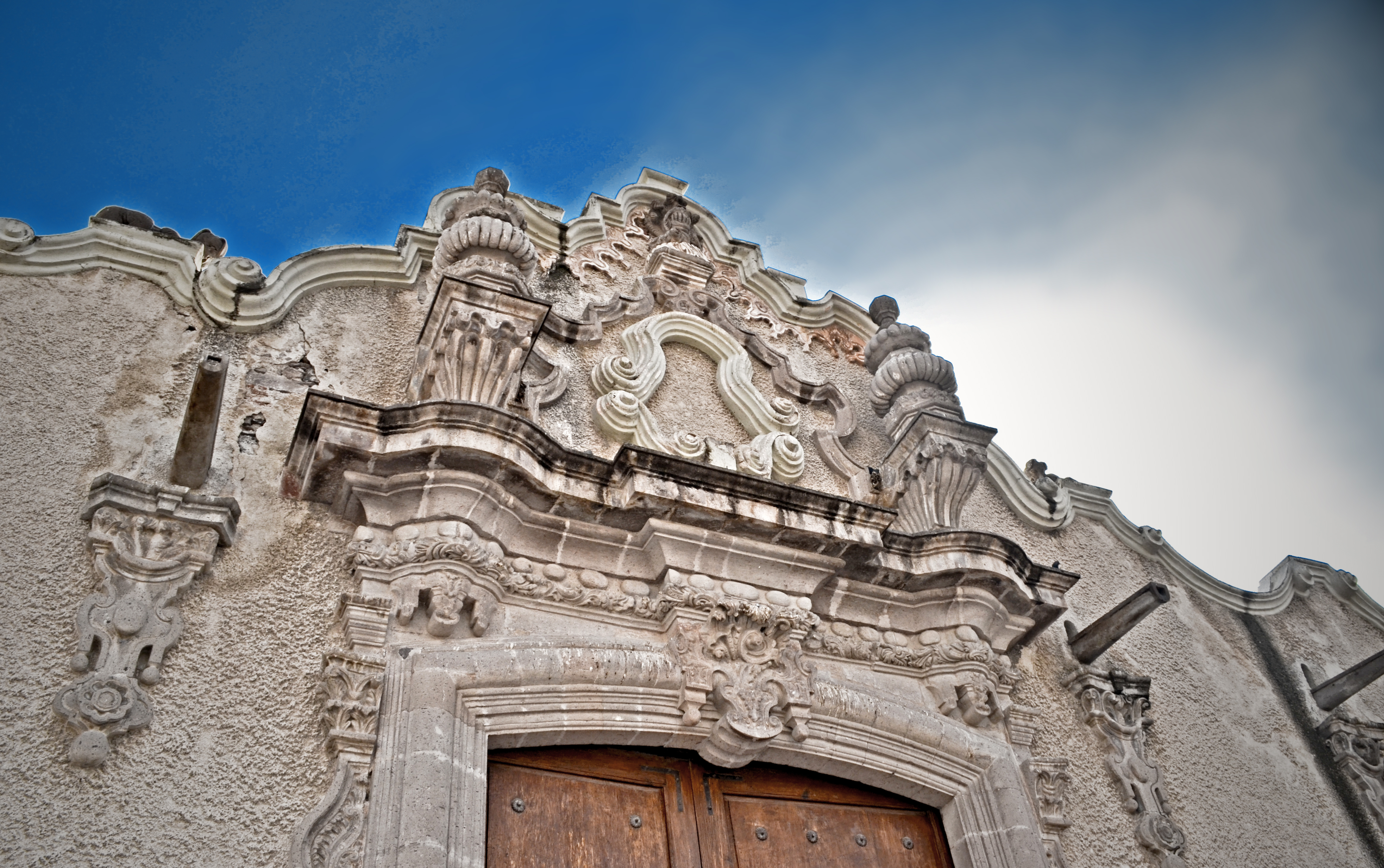
- Palacio de Herrera

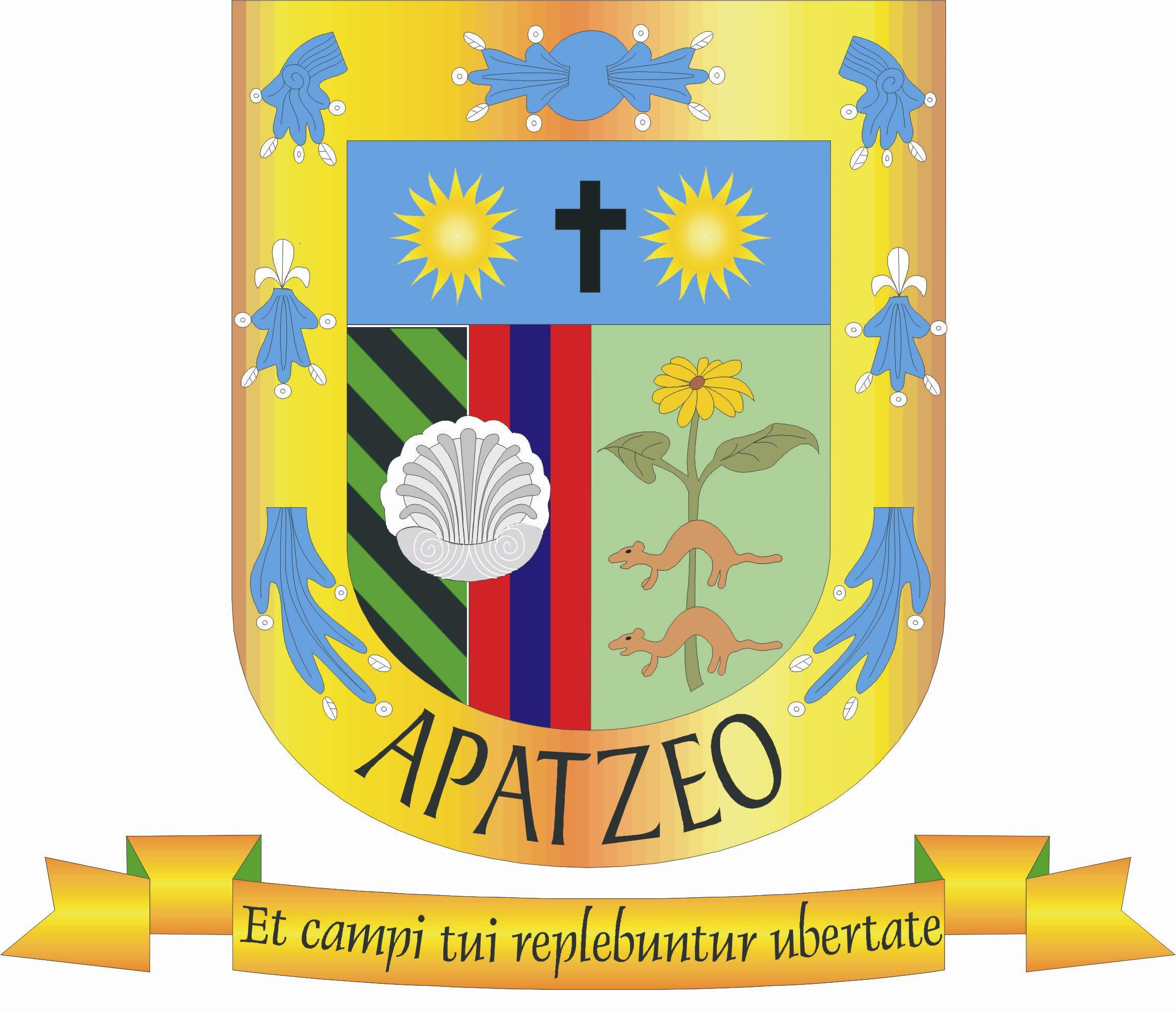
- Coat of arms
- Motto: Et Campi tui Replebentur Ubetate
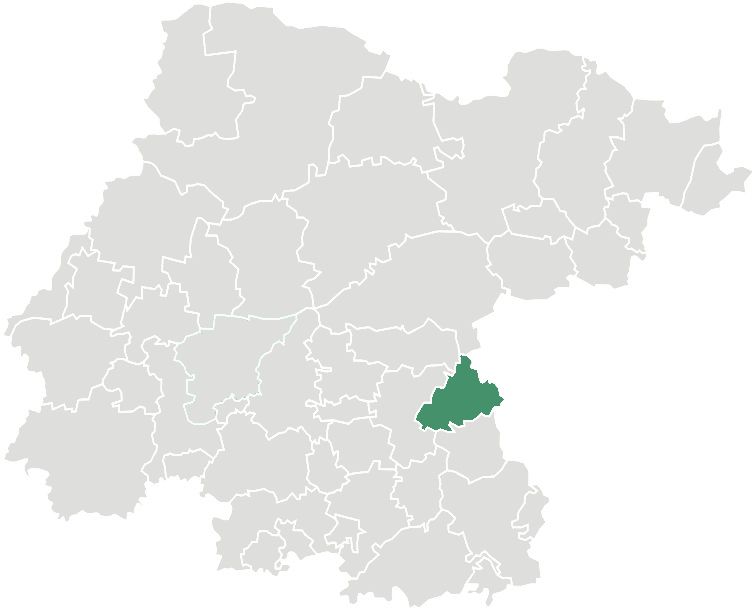

- Location within Guanajuato Location within Mexico
- Coordinates: 20°33′11.34″N 100°38′4.99″W
- Country: Mexico
- State: Guanajuato
- Foundation: June 24, 1536

Government
  - Mayor: Jose Luis Oliveros Usabiaga (2021- )

Area
  - Total: 415.26 km^{2} (160.33 sq mi)

Population
  - Total: 85,319
- Demonym: Apaseense
- INEGI code: 005
- Website: www.apaseoelgrande.gob.mx

Apaseo el Grande is a city and municipality located in Guanajuato, Mexico. The municipality covers 415.26 square kilometres (160 sq mi). It is bordered on the north by Comonfort and San Miguel de Allende, on the east by Querétaro in the State of Querétaro, on the south by Apaseo el Alto, and on the west by Celaya. The municipality had a population of 85,319 inhabitants according to the 2010 census.

In pre-Columbian times, the region was known as Andahe ("Close to the water") and Atlayahualco ("Place where water flows") by the Otomí and Nahua inhabitants. It was eventually known as Apatzeo ("Yellow flower") by the Purépecha. Following the Spanish conquest c.1525, Apaseo was the first town founded in what is now the state of Guanajuato. It received its present name of Apaseo el Grande in 1957, to avoid confusion with the neighboring town of Apaseo el Alto.

== Etymology ==
The initial name of the town and municipality was Apatzeo, first used by Hernán Pérez de Bocanegra y Córdoba, who was apparently influenced by the expression in the Purépecha language meaning "place of weasels".

Other names of the city of Apaseo el Grande were Andehe (in the Otomi language) which appears in an inscription that is in the choir of the parish church and means "by the water". Another name, used by the viceroy Antonio de Mendoza, was Atlayahualco, from the Nahuatl language, meaning "by the lake".

On February 22, 1957, the Legislature of the State of Guanajuato ordered the publication in the Official Gazette of the State of Guanajuato, Decree Number 64, by which the city and the municipality of Apaseo took the nickname 'Apaseo el Grande' ("greater" or "larger"). This change was intended to resolve conflicts caused by the use of the nickname 'Apaseo el Bajo' ("Lower Apaseo") by residents of the smaller neighboring town of Apaseo el Alto ("Upper Apaseo").

== History ==
The location of Apaseo el Grande – probably along with other towns in the region such as Izcuinapan (San Miguel Viejo, near San Miguel de Allende) and Tlachco (the present city of Querétaro) – was inhabited by various indigenous groups of Nahuatl, Otomi and Guamar peoples from ancient times and as a place of refuge following the Spanish conquest of Mexico.

=== Spanish colonization ===
The territory was conquered by Nuño Beltrán de Guzmán c. 1530, but its formal incorporation into the Spanish empire did not occur until 1538, by act of congregation of Indian villages issued by Viceroy Antonio de Mendoza. In 1537, Don Hernán Pérez de Bocanegra began buying properties from Don Fernando P. Motoci, lord of Xuaxo, and on October 11, 1564, entailed these under the mayorazgo system so the properties would be passed down in his family via primogeniture. This area became eastern Bajío, the name by which Spaniards, Creoles, Mestizos, Indians, blacks and mulattos called the property belonging to the principal landowner of the region.

By 1571, Apaseo had 50 Spanish families, 200 blacks, 150 mulattos, and 240 Otomi Indians who also spoke Nahuatl.

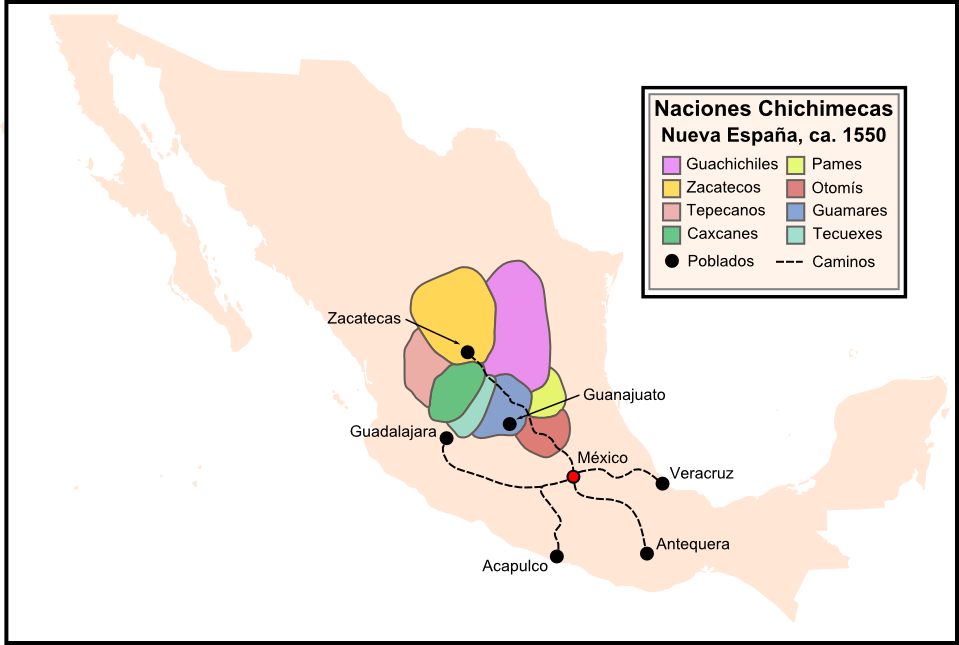
Chichimecas nations in 1550

In 1547, silver deposits discovered in Zacatecas resulted in a steady stream of migration to the region, seen by the semi-nomadic Chichimecas as intrusions on their ancestral lands. Underpaid Spanish soldiers raided native villages to acquire slaves for the mines, and the Chichimicas made attacks against herders and traders on the border. Led by Bocanegra, the village of Apaseo defended itself against the Chichimecas, and the nearby town of Celaya was founded to bolster the region's defence. As the costly Chichimeca War entered its fourth decade, the colonial authorities reversed their aggressive treatment of the Chichimeca and introduced the "peace by purchase" policy, countering the insurgency by rewarding peaceful behavior while taking steps to settle them in villages and assimilate them.

=== Viceroyalty ===
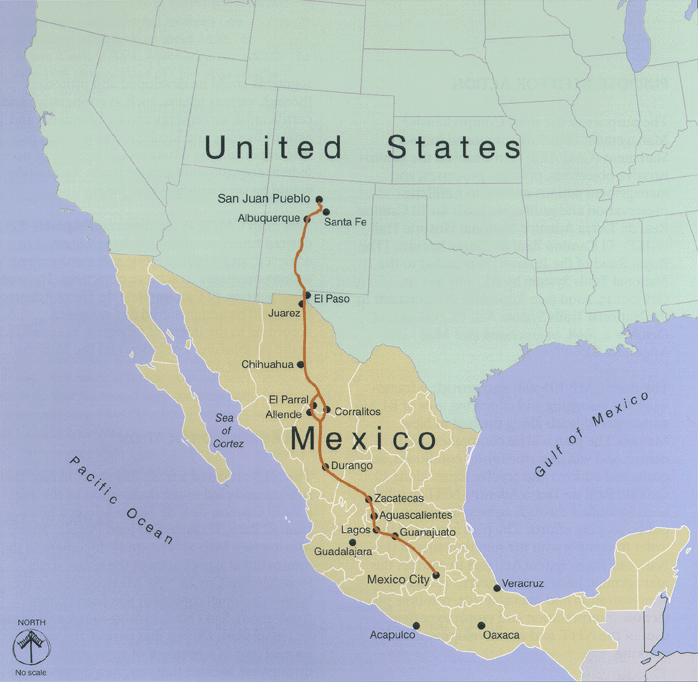
El Camino Real (the Royal Road)

During the 1640s, Apaseo embarked upon a period of economic expansion through ranching in Ixtla, el Peñón and Apaseo el Alto, and fabric manufacturing in Ixtla. The village was inhabited mostly by Indians, especially Otomi, who were already in the process of assimilating. Many had adopted Spanish surnames such as Valencia, Arrieta, Esparragoza, Sánchez, and González; others translated names like Águila (Eagle) or Conejo (Rabbit). Blacks and mulattos were employed as servants on farms centered around the village of Ixtla.

In 1690, Apaseo's baptistery was expanded to a parish church with its existing architectural form as the town's main building. These were times of economic prosperity for Apaseo that united traditional grain and fruit farmers with cattle and sheep farmers. Sheep produced meat and wool, which was especially valued to create garments woven in Obraje de San Diego de Ixtla and Obrajuelo. Wool supplies fueled wholesale and retail markets in Zacatecas, Guadalajara, Mexico City and the Bajío zone through the Camino Real (Royal Road).

By 1748, Apaseo was the fourth-largest city in what would be the state of Guanajuato. The indigenous people of Apaseo started to build a temple on the Camino Real, which was completed c.1824 and was dedicated to the Divina Pastora, better known today as the Pastorcita. In December 1786, the village of Apaseo and its jurisdiction were incorporated into the Municipality of Guanajuato, along with the city of Celaya. Problems soon arose over land distribution and legal funds, and Apaseo clashed with the Mayorazgo over water rights.

=== War of Independence ===
The leaders of the Hidalgo Revolt, theologian Miguel Hidalgo y Costilla and military officer Ignacio Allende, were known and esteemed in Apaseo – Allende's sister was married to the village's Síndico Procurador (city attorney), Don Domingo Busce. When the uprising approached Celaya in September 1810, a panic broke out in the city. Starting on 22 September, Spaniards fled to refuge at Querétaro.

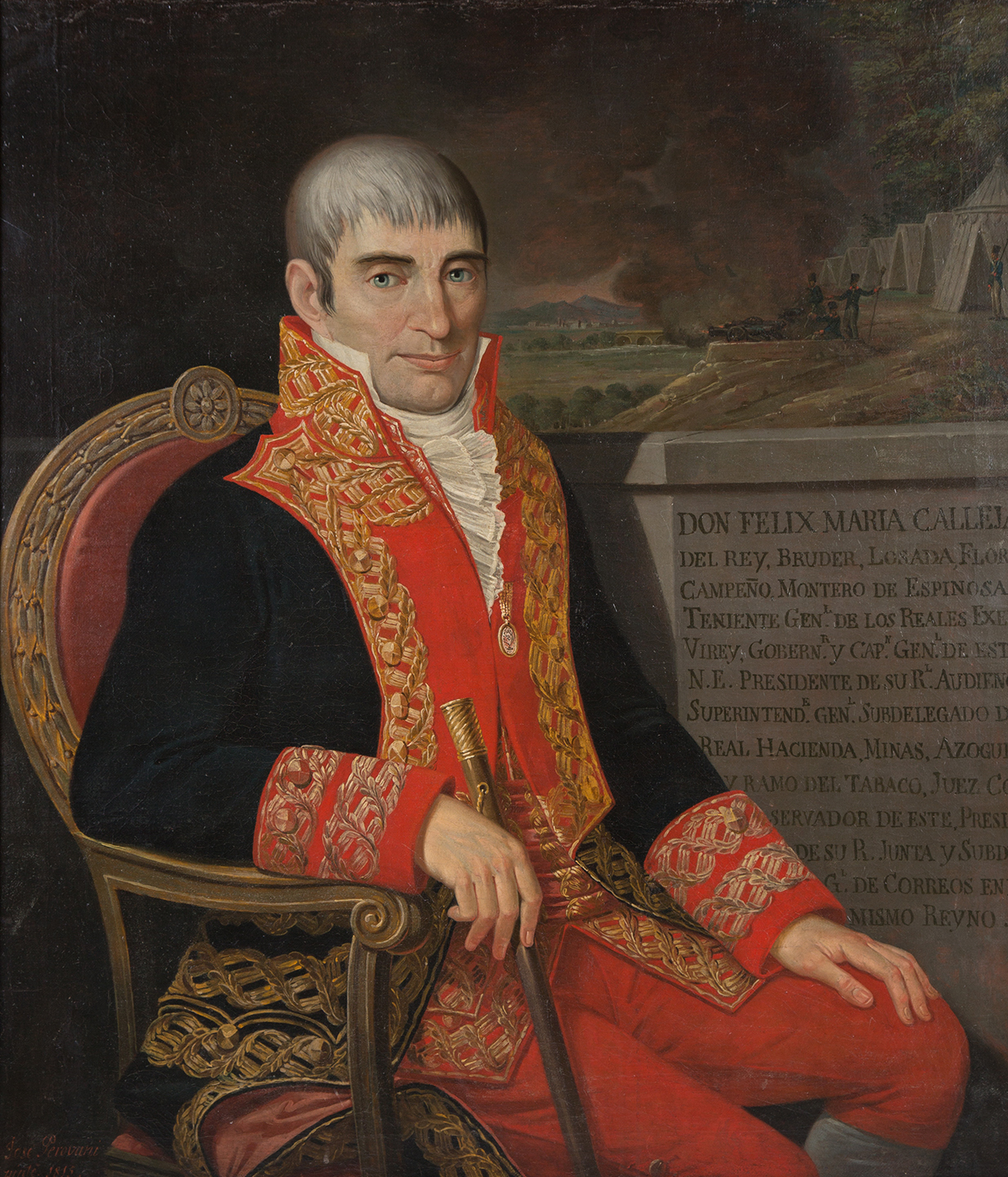
Félix María Calleja

On September 26, in perhaps the first offensive action, colonial troops attacked Apaseo to arrest Busce, who was accused of complicity with the insurgents. During mid-November, 7,000 men under command of Don Felix Maria Calleja stayed overnight in Apaseo, while preparing to engage Allende's rebels.

On September 9, 1812, the rebel Colonel Don Antonio Velasco attacked Apaseo, defeating the village's small colonial garrison. The following year, Apaseo established additional colonial garrisons at the haciendas El Tunal and Obrajuelo. Agustin de Iturbide began a relentless war against the insurgents in Bajio, working with Apaseo Parish Priest Don Manuel María Rodeles and families of the village.

In late 1815, the insurgents were active near Apaseo and on December 19 they killed three soldiers form the El Tunal garrison. Using tactics of damaging the economic base, insurgents attacked the Hacienda de Ameche on April 25, 1818. On July 9, 1818, safeguards were ordered so merchants and artisans from Celaya could attend to business in Apaseo with minimal risk.

On December 30, 1819, Pablo Esquivel, leader of the Picacho rebels, was captured and beheaded by the Apaseo garrison. On January 6, 1820, insurgent José Trinidad Aguado was captured and executed, and it seemed there was victory of the royal arms over the insurgency in Apaseo.

After Iturbide and Vicente Guerrero agreed to end the conflict in 1821, the Spanish garrison left Apaseo. By November 1821, independence was recognized across the country. Apaseo retained its municipal status under the new government, and on April 14, 1826, elected its first constitutional mayor, Don José Pablo Gomez.

In 1830, Apaseo's textile mills failed, as did others across the country due to the impact of British textile imports. This brought economic hardship, and the same year a severe cholera epidemic killed 680 people.

=== Reform Era (1855–1876) ===
In 1856, Don Octaviano Muñoz Ledo purchased the Mayorazgo Hacienda and the adjoining haciendas of San Jose and San Cristobal, solidifying his family's long-standing relationship with Apaseo.

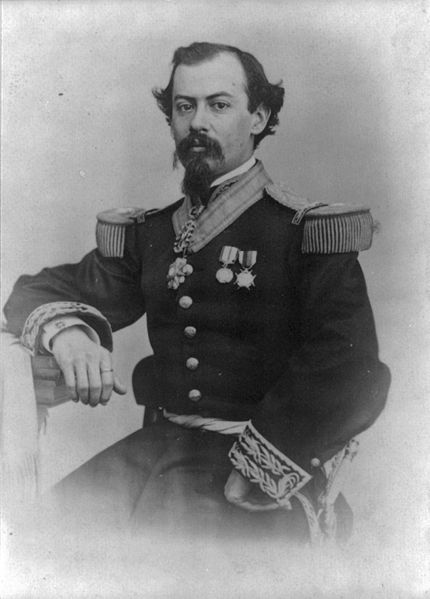
Miguel Miramón

During the Reform War (1857–1860), Apaseo saw much action due to its strategic location to access the Bajio region. In the Battle of Celaya (1858), General Luis G. Osollo's army, in combination with Casanova and General Tomás Mejía, attacked General Don Anastasio Parrodi; Osollo chased Parrodi into Salamanca and defeated the Liberal forces.

Meanwhile, Apaseo witnessed an act of chivalry from General Miguel Miramón who – knowing that General Don Santiago Tapia was seriously injured and taking refuge in Apaseo – promised not to disturb the wounded and also sent his doctor to treat them.

The eventual Liberal victory meant full implementation of the 1857 Constitution and the reform laws, mainly the Confiscation (Disentailment) Act, which affected the church and community assets. In Apaseo, substantial church properties were expropriated, including several farms.

During the second French intervention in Mexico (1861–1867), when the capital was captured, President Juarez withdrew through Apaseo on June 5, 1863, taking the treasury to the interior. Liberal Apasean citizens received him and invited him to refreshment in Don Marcos Corona's house. The resistance crumbled to Franco-Mexican forces and on November 29, 1863, Apaseo and Celaya signed the accession instrument to the Second Mexican Empire in the presence of Mejía. French troops appeared in Apaseo and Celaya on December 3.

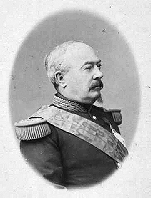
François Achille Bazaine

Maximilian I took the throne, and toured the Bajío in August 1864. He was warmly received in Apaseo, though Liberals including Don Canuto Gómez hid the temple bell clappers, forcing improvisation using hammers to ring the bells for the Emperor's party. Marshal François Achille Bazaine married on June 26, 1865, and Maximilian provided a dowry of two farms in Apaseo. The new government had seized and redistributed more than half of the old part of Apaseo: most properties had belonged to Liberals but the Mayorazgo Hacienda had belonged to Muñoz Ledo, a Conservative.

Among those who rose to defend the Republic and attack Franco-Mexican garrisons along the old Camino Real (then called the National Road) was a female bandit captain called "La Carambada". Her main point of assault was cerca pinta near Caleras de Ameche.

With discontent throughout the country and the withdrawal of French support, Maximilian withdrew to Querétaro. On February 22 and 23, 1867, General Mendez's Imperial Brigade of 3,000 men stayed in Apaseo on their way to join Maximilian. Behind them, the Republican army of 17,000 men passed through on March 4 and 8.

On June 30, 1870, the town of Apaseo received the title of Villa.

On May 18, 1874, Muñoz Ledo died at 68 years old. He had been a senator, minister, and governor of Guanajuato and Querétaro, and introduced the telegraph to the state. At end of his life, he had many difficulties recovering his properties.

=== Porfirism (1876–1910) ===
During the 35-year regime of Porfirio Díaz, peace allowed for the creation of much-delayed public works in Apaseo, particularly in the current Plaza Hidalgo, that was the court of the first parish church and cemetery.

By 1880, Apaseo had constructed an embankment, culverts and railway station. On March 31, 1882, the first passenger train came to Apaseo. The proximity to Querétaro and Celaya prompted Apaseo to become a metropolis of an agricultural area, where activities take place outside the village, at the haciendas and ranches. In 1904, the population of the town was 4,123 and the district was 27,587.

=== Mexican Revolution ===
Little local data exists on these years, but it can be inferred that Don Vicente A. Ruiz won the mayoral elections at the triumph of the Revolution Maderista, and continued his post as Political Chief until the Battle of Celaya. Ruiz managed to take several progressive measures, notably the introducing electricity, drilling for a water supply and organizing civil defenses.

Pancho Villa and Venustiano Carranza disagreed on how to reorganize the country and reached their breaking point on October 10, 1914. Apaseo witnessed fighting between the two sides in the Battle of Celaya (April 6–15, 1915). General Cesareo Castro's cavalry emerged from the forests of the La Labor Hacienda, and played a decisive role in the victory over Villa's army. Ruiz disappeared in the battle, along with many young Apaseenses who fought for Villa under his command. They may have formed the bandidos (outlaw group) "Los del Cerro de la Rosa", whose uprising led to the abandonment of several haciendas and the village of San Miguel de Ixtla.

In 1917, the entrance of the United States in World War I, caused the price of garlic to rise rapidly, increasing the revenue of Apaseo and bringing considerable profits to speculators. In 1918, the Spanish influenza epidemic took 1,500 victims in a month.

The current town hall was completed in 1924, and on November 26 Apaseo received the title of city.

The administration of President Plutarco Elías Calles felt its revolutionary initiatives were challenged by the Catholic Church, and instituted anti-clerical laws leading to the Cristero War (1926–1929). On July 31, 1926, the Mexican Episcopate declared suspension of Catholic worship. The priests of the parish decided to hide in Apaseo, and the Apaseenses Cristeros faced federal army troops on January 4, 1927, at the Cerro del Capulin (now in the municipality of Apaseo el Alto). There were about 100 casualties on both sides. Cristero General Don Manuel Frías began to operate north of the town. Meanwhile, Catholic youths organized activities to raise funds for arms and ammunition.

On April 1, 1927, Frías unexpectedly surrounded the Plaza Hidalgo with his troops and arrested City Treasurer Ranulfo Molina, forcing him to deliver the public funds. Frías then robbed the railway station and telegraph office. They used some of the money to buy food for the Cristeros guerrillas and departed.

When diplomacy brought an agreement between the bishops and the Mexican government, the conflict effectively ended, and church bells were rung for the first time in almost three years. Public worship resumed in the Parish Church of Apaseo on July 12, 1929.

=== Modern era ===
In 1939, the Pan-American Highway was plotted through Querétaro on the route Apaseo el Alto – Celaya, which was completed in 1942.

In 1947, the District was broken into two municipalities: Apaseo and Apaseo el Alto. In 1948, a cinema opened on Plaza Hidalgo. On October 7, 1955, a prank involving exploding gunpowder caused a stampede in the cinema which left four dead and several injured.

In early 1956, Dr. Salvador Martínez Silva proposed that the city of Apaseo adopt the adjective "El Grande". José Estrella Vazquez sent a memorandum to Congress requesting el grande (English: 'the great') as a nickname for the county. The XLIII State Legislature memorandum responded with Decree No. 64 of February 22, 1957, by which the city and municipality of Apaseo were collectively changed to the title of Apaseo el Grande.

In 1957, an earthquake occurred that closely marked the start of a slow and gradual drying of the spring El Nacimiento, bringing an end to cheap water and large-density irrigation in the municipality. The loss of arable land was estimated at 105 caballerías or 4,440 acres (18.0 km^{2}), leading to Apaseo's descent into poverty. This would be partially alleviated decades later, after the establishment of factories in the city.

In 1958, the construction of the Superhighway Querétaro–Irapuato began. On December 11, 1961, Apaseo City improved its services sector with the opening of a branch of the Bank of Commerce SA. On December 11, 1964, a branch of Banco Nacional de Mexico (Banamex) was founded on the north side of the parish.

On October 12, 1979, the first stone was laid for the municipal market, Antonio Plaza. On August 3, 1980, tax incentives were granted to attract industry to the town in what would become known as the Bajío Industrial Corridor. The first major move was the relocation of a Procter & Gamble factory. In October 1996, a new state hospital opened.

As of March 29, 2021, Apaseo el Grande reported 1,354 confirmed cases and 139 deaths due to the COVID-19 pandemic in Mexico.

Alejandro Galicia Juárez PRD, candidate for alderman, was murdered on March 31, 2021. Mayor Juan Ignacio de la Cruz Ávila was seriously injured.

== Government and politics ==
The 2012 Mayoral elections were won by Mr. Lorenzo Licea Rojas from the Institutional Revolutionary Party (PRI) in alliance with the Green Party (PVEM). The opposition is formed by the National Action Party (PAN) and Party of the Democratic Revolution (PRD). The H. City Council was formed as follows.

Mayor	Lorenzo Rojas Licea, PRI
Síndico (city attorney)	Moisés Ulises Macías Muñoz, PVEM
Regidor (alderman)	Jose Juan Cardena Maldonado, PRI
Regidor	Alfonso Cabrera Oliveros, PRI
Regidor	María De Los Angeles Bautista Cervantes, PRI
Regidor	Moisés Guerrero Lara, PAN
Regidor	Román Gómez Bravo, PAN
Regidor	Ana Lilia Rodriguez Molina, PAN
Regidor	Efrain Rubio Rico, PRD
Regidor	Carlos Martínez Ramírez, PVEM

The Municipality is organized into 49 communities, represented by elected delegates. The Federal Deputy of District XIV is José Luis Oliveros Usabiaga and the local representative is Martin Lopez Camacho, both of the PAN.

== Geography ==
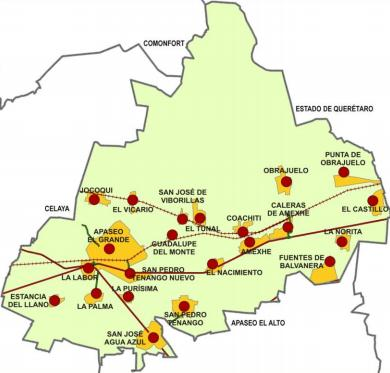
Localities in Apaseo el Grande

The city of Apaseo el Grande is the capital of the municipality of the same name in the state of Guanajuato. The municipality is bordered on the north by the municipalities of Comonfort and San Miguel de Allende; to the east by the state of Querétaro; to the south by the municipality of Apaseo el Alto; and to the west by Celaya. The city is located at an altitude of 1,767 metres (5,797 ft) on the margins of the watercourse of the Querétaro river, a tributary of the Laja River which flows into the Lerma River. Apaseo el Grande extends over an area of 415.26 km^{2} (160.33 sq mi), or 1.37% of the total area of the state. It ranks 20th of 46 municipalities in Guanajuato according to its 2010 Urbanization Index value of 0.59, much lower than the state level of 25.7.

=== Topography ===
The Sierra de los Agustinos range enters the town from the south, and the Sierra Codornices from the west. The highest elevations are found in the hills (Spanish: cerros) of Santa Rosa, Pelon, El Picacho, Peña, Ojo de Agua, El Tejocote, El Cohetero, La Huerta, Jalpa, Galvanes, Mayorazgo, and Vicar Estancia de las Vacas. Their average height is 2,000 metres (6,600 ft) above sea level. The highest point of the municipality is 2,598 metres (8,524 ft), at Cerro de La Rosa, on the municipality's border with Celaya to the north.

=== Hydrography ===
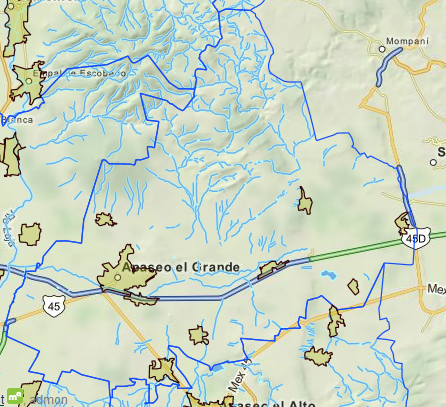
Streams in Apaseo el Grande

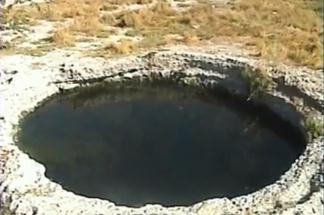
Hervideros (hot springs) at Caleras de Amexhe

The main body of water is the Apaseo River, a tributary of the Laja River. In Querétaro, it forms currents and rivers like Huipal, from the state of Querétaro, that enters streams to the municipality of San Bartolo and Ixtla and the river Apaseo el Alto. There are two springs of sulphurous water, namely the Marroquín and the Mandujano. The town also has three alkaline water springs: El Nacimiento, Agua Tibia and Llanitos. The waters of Cañada Mandujano Cedazo and Ojos de Apaseo el Alto, gathered into streams, are used to irrigate the valley lands.

=== Climate ===
It is mild and pleasant throughout the year, with a maximum temperature of 37.1 °C (98.8 °F), and a minimum of 0.9 °C (33.6 °F). The annual rainfall is 606 mm (23.9 in). The northern part of the municipality has a dry climate, with an annual average temperature between 12 and 22 °C (54 and 72 °F), and rainfalls of 400–600 mm (16–24 in). In the central part there is a semi-dry climate, with annual temperatures between 18 and 20 °C (64 and 68 °F) and precipitation of 557–615 mm (21.9–24.2 in). To the south is a warm climate with summer rain totaling less than 5% of the winter rain, and average temperatures ranging between 7 and 14 °C (45 and 57 °F). June is the warmest month.

Climate data for Apaseo el Grande (1991–2020 normals, extremes 1961–present)
Month	Jan	Feb	Mar	Apr	May	Jun	Jul	Aug	Sep	Oct	Nov	Dec	Year
Record high °C (°F)	37 (99)	39 (102)	37 (99)	41 (106)	42 (108)	39 (102)	39 (102)	39.5 (103.1)	38.5 (101.3)	38.5 (101.3)	38.5 (101.3)	35.5 (95.9)	42 (108)
Mean daily maximum °C (°F)	25.1 (77.2)	26.9 (80.4)	29.0 (84.2)	31.1 (88.0)	32.0 (89.6)	30.1 (86.2)	28.8 (83.8)	28.7 (83.7)	28.1 (82.6)	27.7 (81.9)	26.7 (80.1)	25.6 (78.1)	28.3 (82.9)
Daily mean °C (°F)	15.7 (60.3)	17.4 (63.3)	19.5 (67.1)	21.7 (71.1)	23.2 (73.8)	22.6 (72.7)	21.6 (70.9)	21.4 (70.5)	21.0 (69.8)	19.7 (67.5)	18.0 (64.4)	16.3 (61.3)	19.8 (67.6)
Mean daily minimum °C (°F)	6.4 (43.5)	7.9 (46.2)	10.0 (50.0)	12.3 (54.1)	14.5 (58.1)	15.1 (59.2)	14.4 (57.9)	14.1 (57.4)	13.9 (57.0)	11.7 (53.1)	9.2 (48.6)	7.0 (44.6)	11.4 (52.5)
Record low °C (°F)	0 (32)	−0.5 (31.1)	0 (32)	0.5 (32.9)	5.5 (41.9)	6.5 (43.7)	6 (43)	2 (36)	4 (39)	3 (37)	0 (32)	−3 (27)	−3 (27)
Average precipitation mm (inches)	11.5 (0.45)	12.6 (0.50)	13.2 (0.52)	9.2 (0.36)	36.7 (1.44)	113.9 (4.48)	157.2 (6.19)	128.7 (5.07)	132.3 (5.21)	40.2 (1.58)	12.3 (0.48)	4.7 (0.19)	672.5 (26.48)
Average precipitation days (≥ 0.1 mm)	2.5	1.8	2.3	2.3	6.6	11.2	14.6	13.6	11.9	5.4	2.2	1.3	75.7
Source: Servicio Meteorológico Nacional

=== Vegetation ===
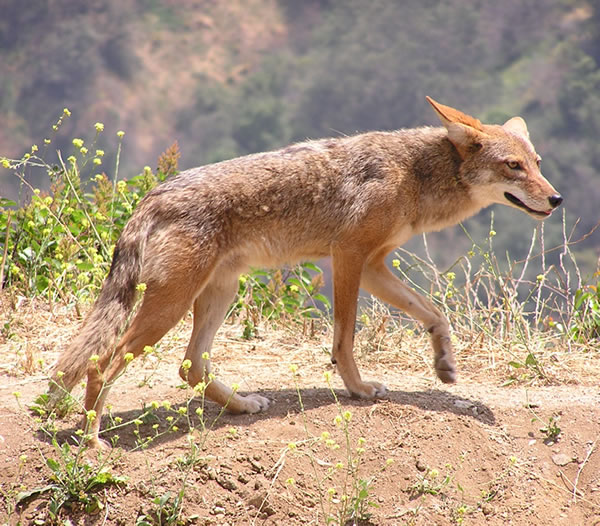
Coyote

The flora consists of deciduous forest and mesquite. There are hounds tooth, grass pastures, zacatón, Colorado grass, blue glandular grama filiform, bilberry cactus, buffalo grass, false grass, foxtail, woolly and wolfhounds, along with forage species and huaraches, several species of cactus and cacahuetes, etc.

=== Wildlife ===
The reported species in the area have endured heavy pressure from urbanization, and include the opossum, coyote, hare, rabbit, and birds like the thrush.

== Demographics ==
Based on the 2010 Census of Population and Housing conducted by the National Institute of Statistics and Geography (INEGI), the city of Apaseo el Grande has 85,319 inhabitants of whom 41,038 are men and 44,281 are women, and 28.3% of the population is under 30. An increase in population in the coming years is expected due to the construction of housing projects in the outskirts of the metropolitan area of Querétaro, within the municipality of Apaseo el Grande.

=== Education ===
The Township of Apaseo el Grande offered 13 degree programs in 2010. 6.5% of the population 25 years and older have higher education (technical or commercial studies, completed high school, undergraduate, masters and/or PhD).

=== Religion ===
94.4% of the population identifies as Catholic. Since 1980, evangelical and Pentecostal groups entered into the communities, accounting for 2.5% of the population.

=== Migration ===
Apaseenses' emigration to the United States is primarily to cities in Texas, especially Dallas, possibly because of family ties and support to aid with employment prospects. North Carolina is also a common destination. The municipality ranks 26th in Guanajuato in migration levels.

== Economy ==
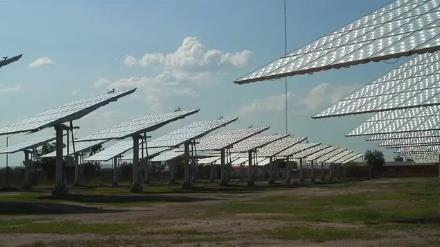
Photovoltaic Plant in Industrial Park La Amistad

The Municipality of Apaseo el Grande was traditionally an agricultural and livestock center. Agriculture benefited from the construction of the irrigation district of the Upper Lerma. The main crops are alfalfa, beans, corn, grasses and sorghum. Cattle, pigs and goats are raised, and fowl are bred. These activities have been reduced as a percentage of the economy in recent years due to the development of several industrial zones in the township. Though industry thrives in Apaseo el Grande, its production services gross total (PBT) is 8.1%, well below the 25.1% statewide total.

Apaseo el Grande occupies a prominent place in the state of Guanajuato for exporting. In 2011, it ranked third in the state, behind only Silao and Irapuato. The majority of these exports are produced by Procter & Gamble, and are shipped to the United States and Latin America.

Apaseo el Grande ranks 6 out of 46 municipalities in per capita PBT, 123,697, well above the state value of 80,315. But this wealth is poorly distributed among the population, with 56% of the population considered to be living in poverty.

== Culture and tourism ==
=== Points of interest ===
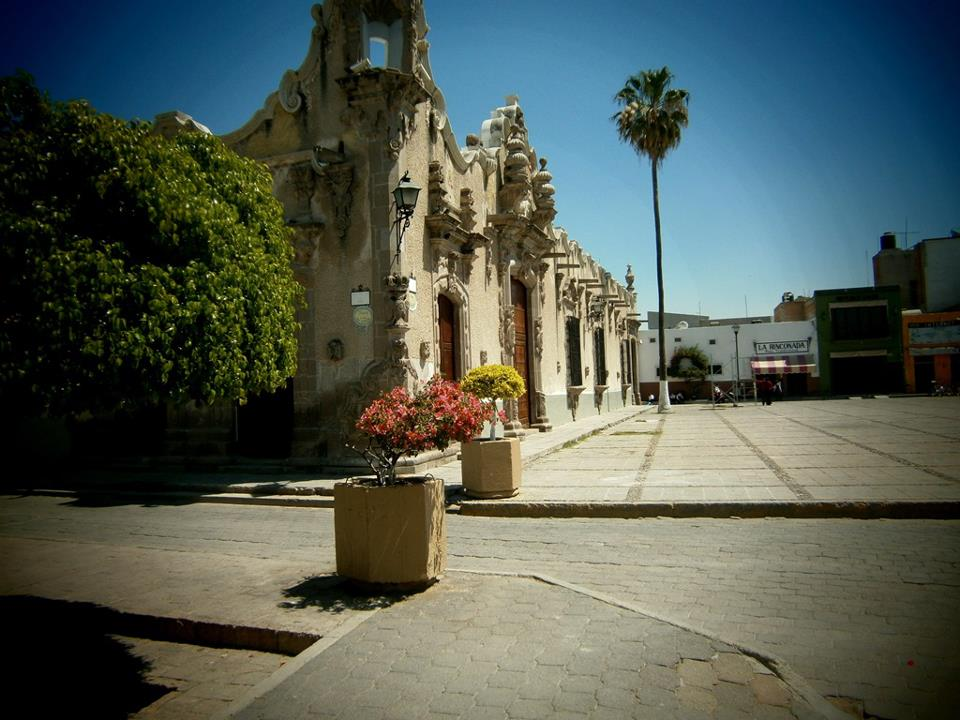
Palacio de Herrera (a.k.a. Casa de los Perros)

==== Palacio de Herrera ====
The Palace of Herrera (commonly called "Casa de los Perros" or the House of Dogs) is a prominent eighteenth-century colonial building. Constructed in a sober baroque style, this palace was commissioned by Don Francisco Fernández de Herrera y Antonio Merino Areávalo, landowner and merchant. Maximilian I stayed here while touring the Bajío. It is privately owned, with no public access.

==== Hacienda El Tunal ====
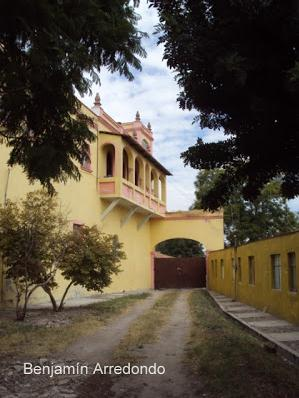
Hacienda El Tunal

Fernández de Herrera owned several farms and ranches, some of which remained in the family for generations, as was the case for the Hacienda El Tunal. The hacienda was renovated in the latter nineteenth century, so it no longer represents the style of eighteenth century Bajío architecture. Access is restricted.

==== Temple and Franciscan Convent ====
This old set of buildings dates to the sixteenth century. The exterior of the church and its convent are in a military monastic style and the interior of the temple is neoclassical. Several chapels are attached to the temple with an open atrium.

==== Hacienda El Vicario ====
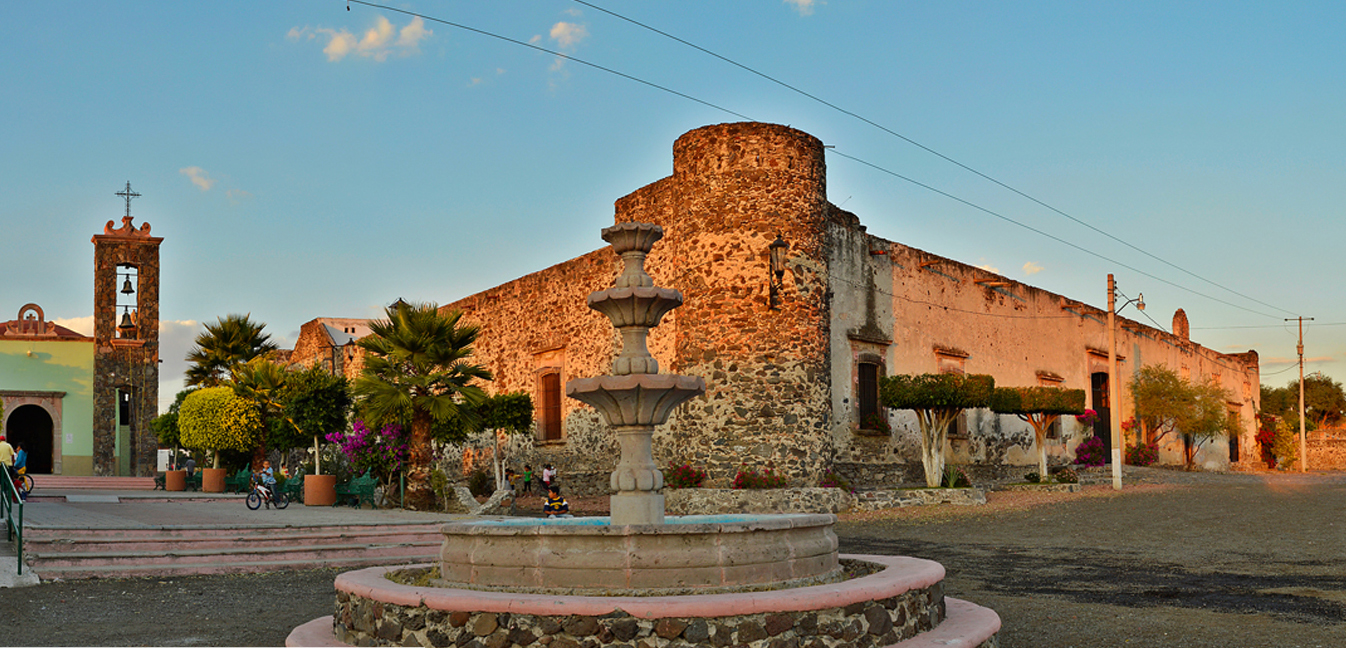
Hacienda El Vicario

The Vicar appears to be a single piece from the outside. It is rumored that in 1814, the royalist army stationed soldiers on the estates of Apaseo, including El Vicario.

==== Railway station ====
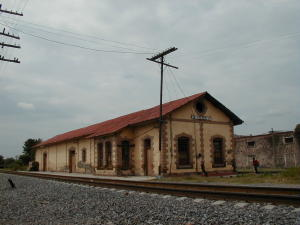
Railway station

This was one of the main stations of Guanajuato state for a quarter of exports, including agricultural products. The train was also used for transportation to border cities until the late-twentieth century. It is now in disrepair with no public access.

==== Hacienda La Labor ====
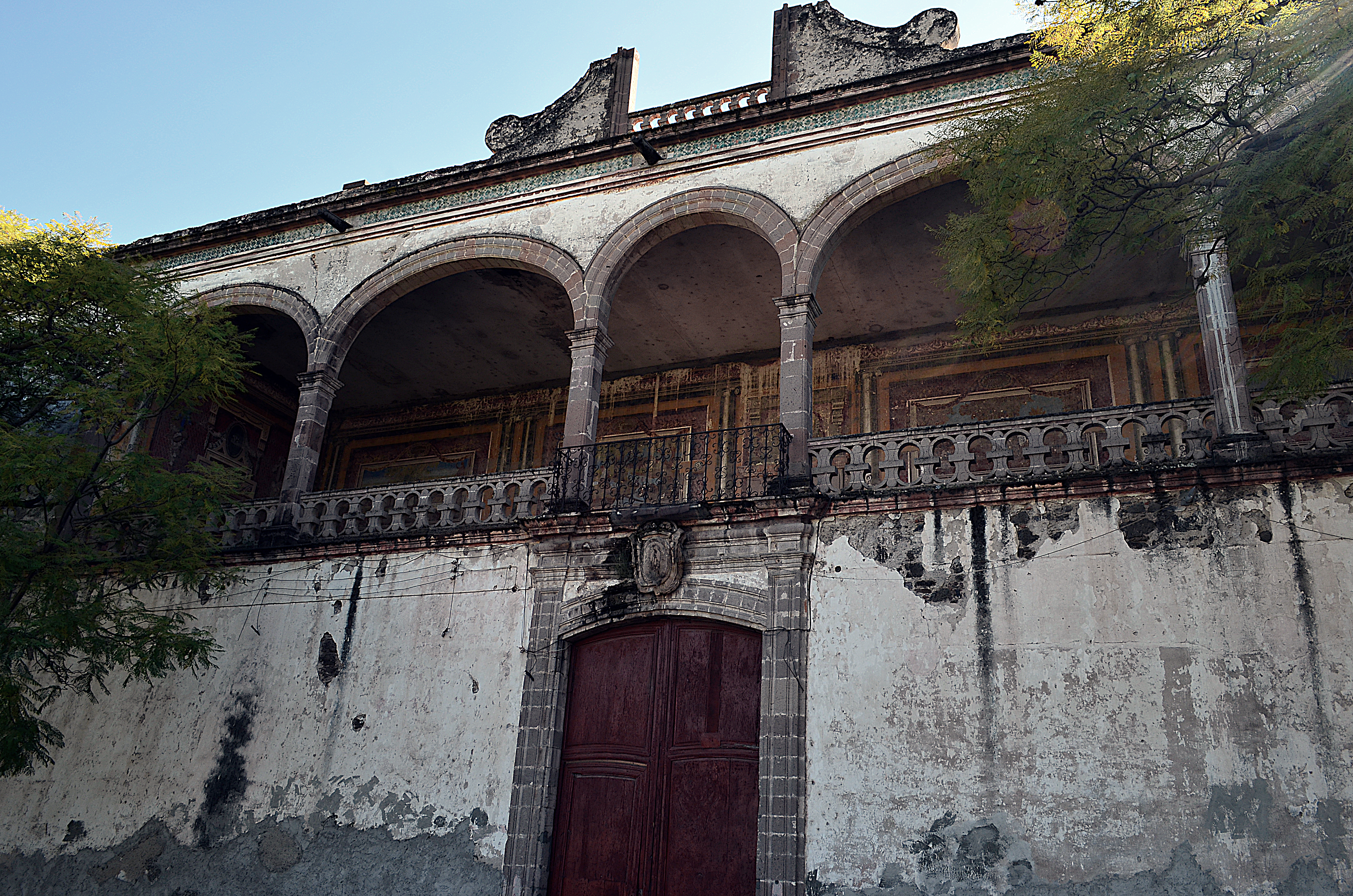
Ex Hacienda La Labor

Erected in the late-eighteenth century by José Ignacio Villaseñor Cervantes, this hacienda retains the outlines of its facade with neoclassical alterations. It is reminiscent of Renaissance villas with a gallery of arches on columns, a tradition dating to the Conquista.

==== Hacienda de Obrajuelo ====
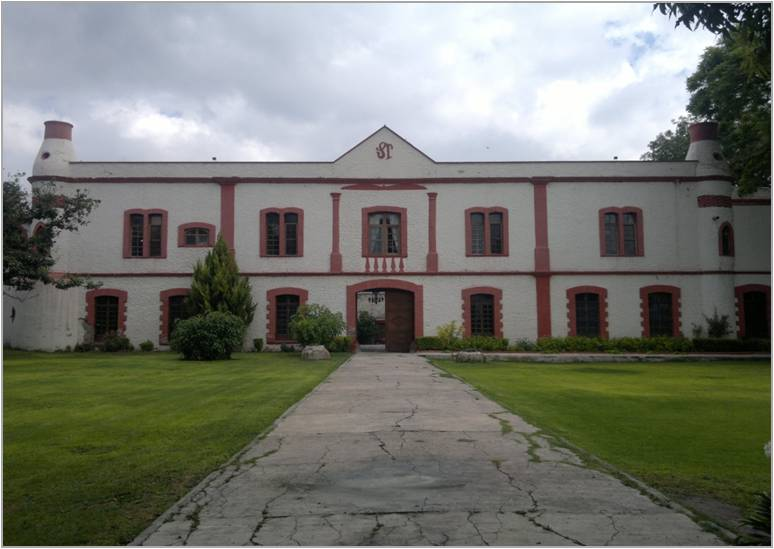
Hacienda de Obrajuelo

Another hacienda that retains historic elements, this belonged to Captain Fausto Merino from the mid-18th century. He donated it to the congregation of clerics of Our Lady of Guadalupe de Querétaro. In the mid-19th century, Maximilian I presented it, with the Buenavista Palace of Mexico City, to Marshal Bazaine as a dowry for his marriage.

==== Pueblo de Ixtla ====
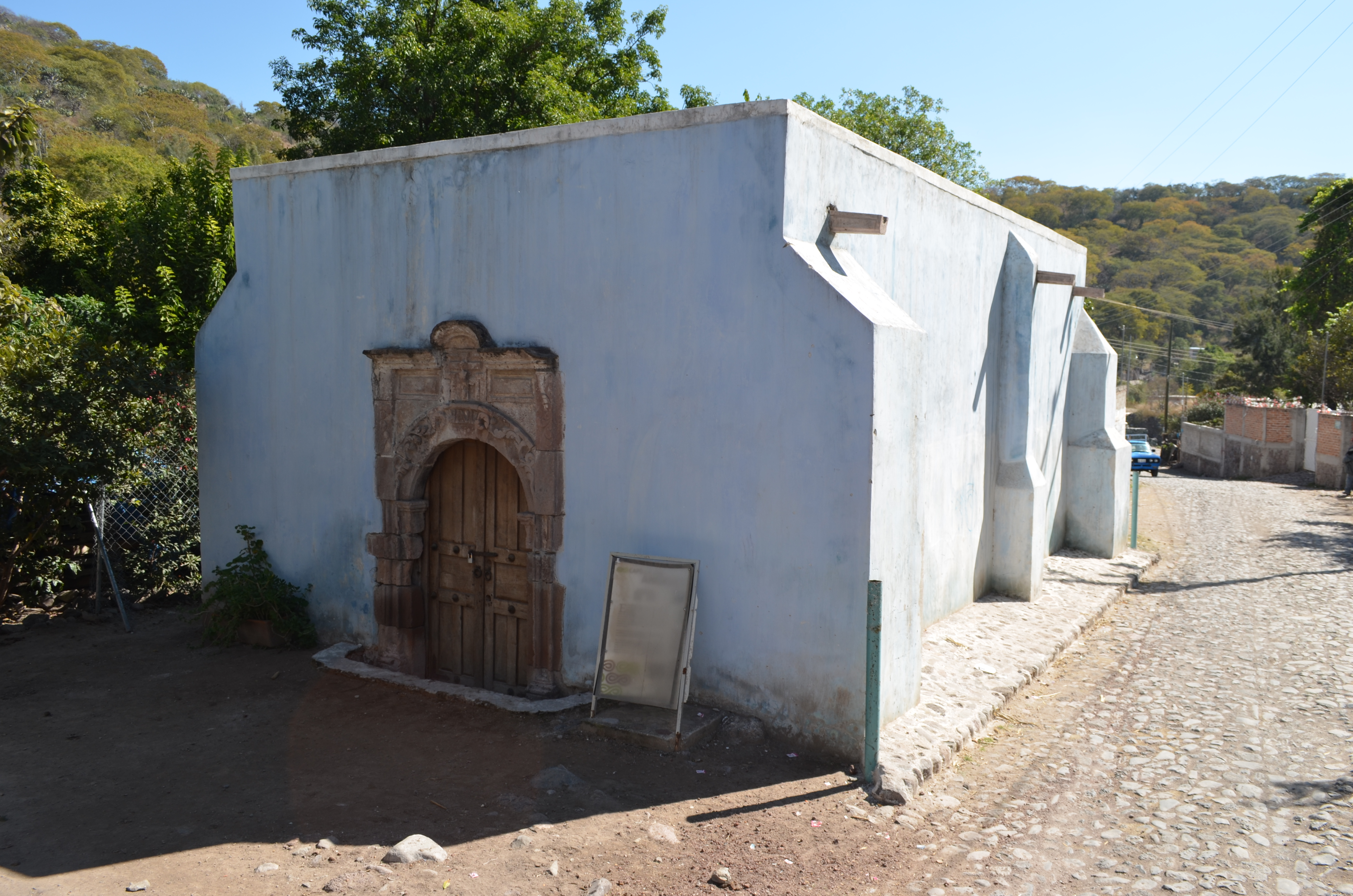
Capilla de Los Ángeles (Ixtla)

Ixtla is the first settlement founded by Spaniards from Querétaro in the state of Guanajuato. Its peculiarity is that it has about 34 chapels, some preserved better than others, belonging to different families that were part of the early population. Some of the most emblematic chapels are being restored. San Miguel Ixtla was recognized as a town c.1550, as a reservation for Otomi Indians. The family chapels were erected as part of the campaign of Christianization undertaken by Franciscans in the Otomi region.

=== Charrería ===
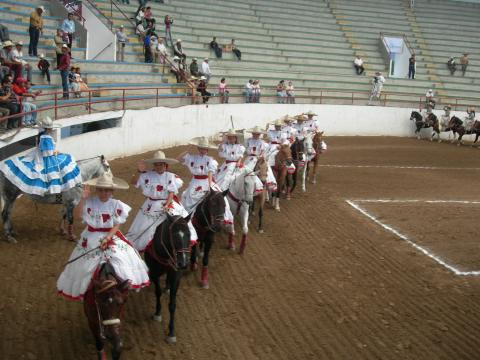
World Charreria Challenge

Charreria is the traditional sport which has promoted the formation of churros through family heritage. The charros team of Apaseo el Grande won the 1961 National Charro Championship in Querétaro. The 4,000-seat Lienzo Charro La Guadalupana opened in 1996, and has hosted two national championships. In addition to charreria, the venue is also used for shows.

=== Festivities ===
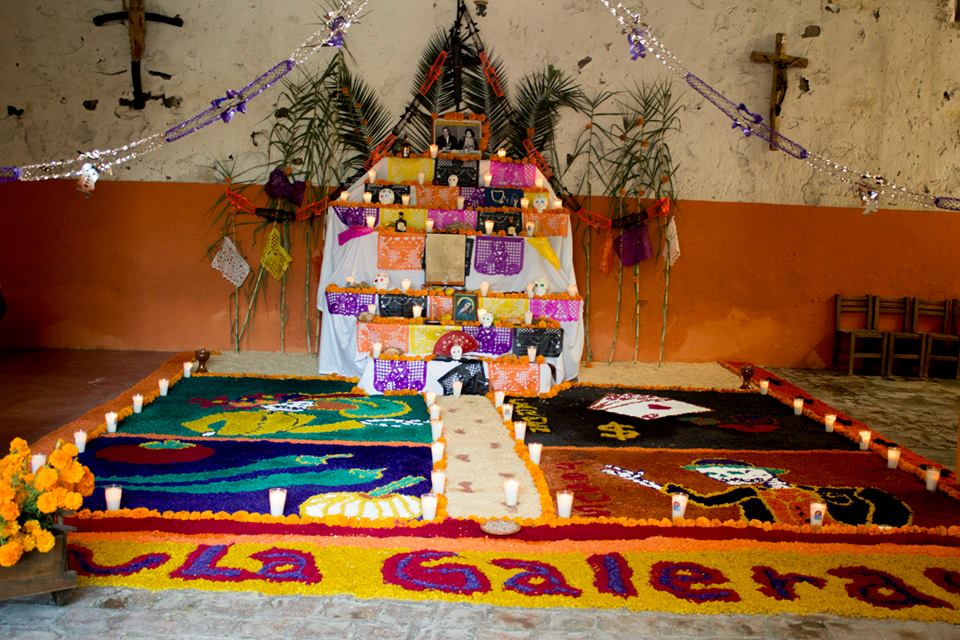
Traditional Altar in Apaseo

- Regional Fair of San Juan Bautista – First organized in June 1950 as an agricultural parade. It is held every year on June 24, celebrating the founding of the city with San Juan Bautista as patron, featuring floats adorned with chariots and decorated with allegories about the saint's life, scenes of conquest, and evangelization. Beginning in 2008, further investment was made for the title of regional fair.
- Circumcision of the Lord – On January 1, this is a highlight of the festivals that take place in the municipal seat and in San Pedro Tenango.
- Day of the Three Kings – On January 6, this symbolic parade features the Magi and gifting of toys to children.
- Semana Santa (Easter) – This features processions through the different villages of the town, with a final destination in the town of Ixtla, where they worship the Lord of Ojo Zarco.
- Virgen del Rosario – Held on October 30.
- Día de Muertos – Held on November 2, people create traditional altars to honor their dead relatives in a festive atmosphere.
- Immaculate Conception – Held on December 8.
- Virgin of Guadalupe – La Villita has a stone with an image of the virgin where parishioners come to worship.

=== Gastronomy ===
"Vacas" (cattle) is a stew which typically consists of crackling with potato hash and even tuna. The dish is wrapped in a thin layer of bread. There is also a sweet bread stuffed with melted cheese, known by the name "Gallo" (rooster). Sweets are also made with jamoncillo milk, cheeses and sausages. In recent years "gorditas" have enjoyed popularity among visitors.

== Notable people ==
- Antonio Plaza Llamas (1830–1882) – poet, soldier and journalist.
- Fernando de Córdoba y Bocanegra (1565–1589) – the third mayorazgo of Apaseo, poet, musician and painter. In 1586, he resigned as primogeniture and lived a life of poverty, charity to the sick Indians, penance and contemplation.
- Andrés Quiles Galindo (1673–1719) – a Franciscan friar and lawyer, assessor of the Holy Office of the Inquisition, provincial minister of the Franciscan Province of San Pedro and San Pablo de Michoacan, Attorney General of the Franciscan Provinces of India.
- Fr. Efren Flores Rico (1889–1986) – priest and benefactor, supporter of the parochial schools and the first high school.
- Francisco Fernández de Herrera y Antonio Merino Arevalo (1755–1824) – landowner, merchant, and Mayor of Celaya. While avoiding giving the whereabouts of Hidalgo insurgents, he remained at his post and used his influence to prevent killings and robberies of Spaniards.
- José María Fernández de Herrera y Gomez (b.1788) – lawyer, deputy mayor of Apaseo, Governor of Querétaro, repeatedly member of the municipalities of Querétaro and Celaya.
- Marciano Tinajero y Estrada (1871–1957) – priest, sixth Bishop of the Diocese of Querétaro.
- José Rebolledo Borja (1886–1969) – lawyer, judge, minister of the Supreme Court of Justice.
- Octaviano Muñoz Ledo (1805 or 1806–1874) – senator, minister, governor of Guanajuato and Querétaro
- Jesus Cabrera Muñoz Ledo (1928–2000) – senator, ambassador, headed UNESCO
- Hector Mendoza Franco (1932–2010) – playwright and theater director
- Roberto Tapia Conyer (born 1954) – epidemiologist specializing in health policy
- David Rabago Oliveros – businessman, financier, construction
- Luis Oliveros Rabago – promoter of charreria
- Francisco Licea y Borja – priest and benefactor, constructed numerous temples
- Caraveo Refugio Aguilar (1893–1974) – poet who fought the Orozquistas and Zapatistas in the Mexican Revolution.
