= Tarimoro Municipality =

Coordinates: 20°17′39″N 100°45′20″W

Tarimoro
- Municipality
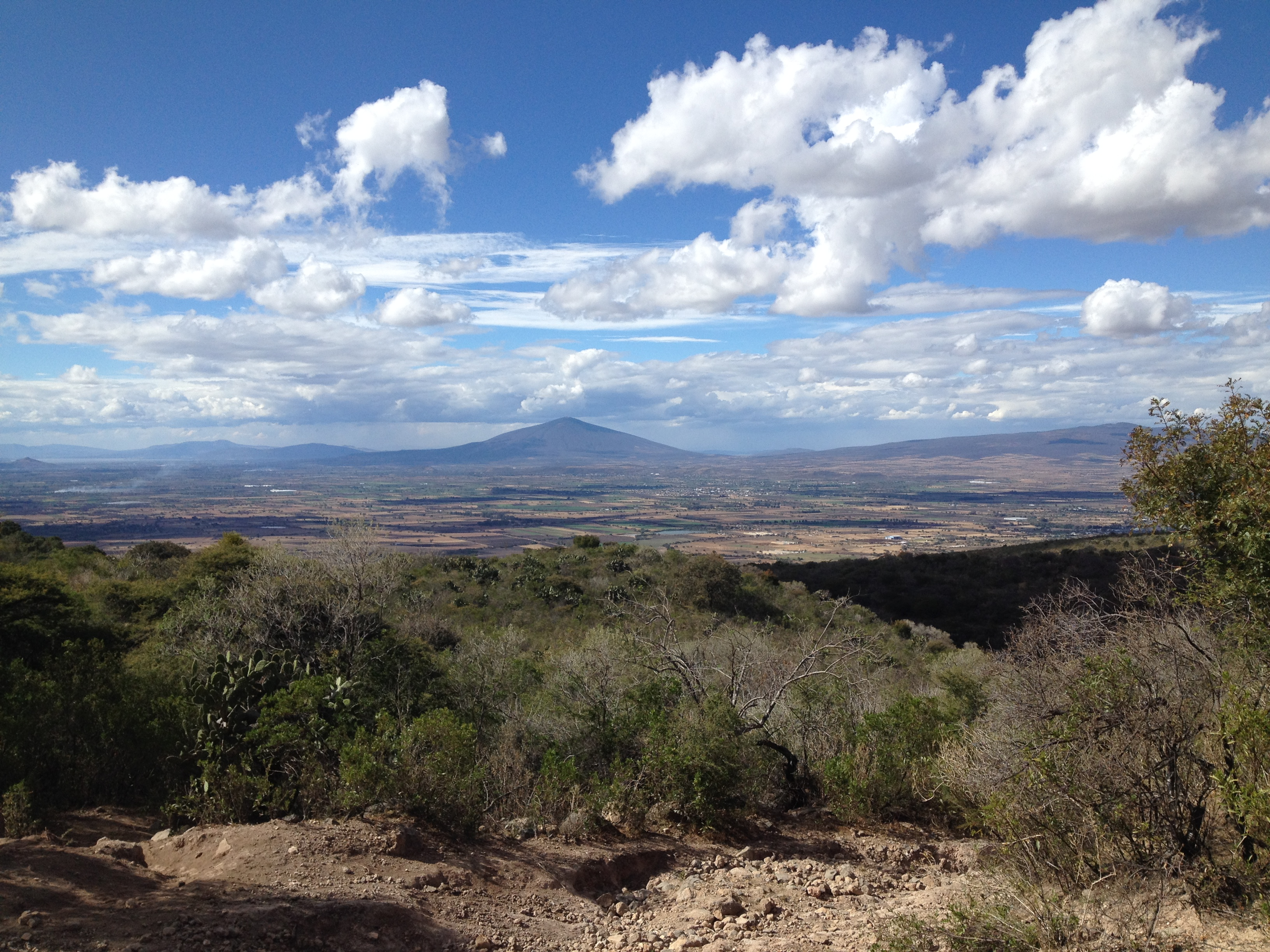
- Interactive map of Tarimoro
- Country: Mexico
- State: Guanajuato
- Municipal seat: Tarimoro, Guanajuato

Population (2020)
  - Total: 35,905
- Time zone: UTC-6 (CST)
  - Summer (DST): UTC-5 (CDT)
- Website: (in Spanish)

Tarimoro is one of the 46 municipalities of the Mexican state of Guanajuato. The municipal seat is the city of Tarimoro.

The two main products that are produced in this municipality are peanuts and bricks. Tarimoro's peanuts are unlike those found anywhere else. They are very distinct, with a thin shell and a sweeter taste. The lands in and around Tarimoro are very fertile and are irrigated by a canal that runs off a local dam called "La Presa del Cubo".

Tarimoro's main areas within Tarimoro City itself are known as "El Barrio", "El Centro", and "La Loma". Other communities such as "El Aguacate" are within walking distance of Tarimoro.

Tarimoro holds annual festivities from 20 to 29 September in honour of its patron saint, Saint Michael the Archangel. The celebrations include a procession through the town centre featuring decorated floats with life-size religious figures. Local musical groups accompany the procession, which is attended by residents and visitors.

The majority of Tarimoro's population have families living in the United States. Particularly concentrated in Dallas, Chicago, San Francisco, San Antonio, and many others scattered over the country. The amount of funds that comes into Tarimoro every year from relatives in the United States has a great impact on its citizens' lives, and is accounted as the main source of income for many families.

== Geography ==
Tarimoro borders Celaya to the north, Cortázar to the northeast, Jerécuaro and Apaseo el Alto to the east, Salvatierra to the west, and Acámbaro to the south.

The most notable sites in Tarimoro are: Tarimoro City, La Moncada, Panales Jamaica (Cañones), San Juan Bautista de Cacalote, Caldares de Panales, El Jardin, El Acebuche, and La Presa.

Tarimoro has mountains to the east, along with a national preserve to the southeast. The climate there is subtropical with rains in September and cold weather from November to January.
