= Sierra de los Agustinos =

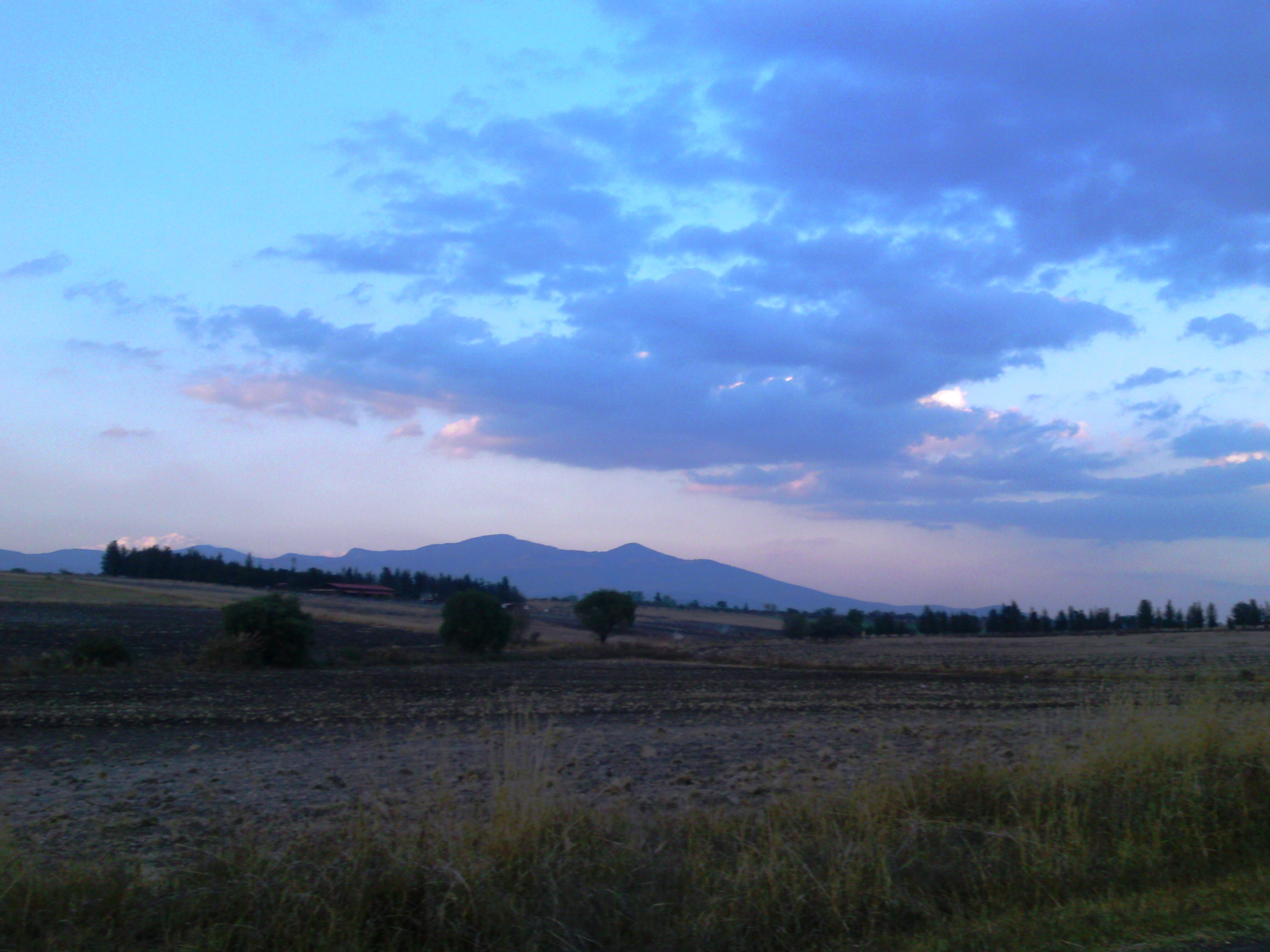
- View of the Sierra de los Agustinos from Acámbaro

Highest point
- Coordinates: 20°13′56″N 100°40′48″W

Geography
- Location within Mexico
- Country: Mexico
- State: Guanajuato
- Municipalities: Acambaro, Jerécuaro and Tarimoro

Sierra de los Agustinos is a mountain range in Guanajuato state of central Mexico. The range is a protected natural area, and provides water, firewood, recreation for the surrounding region.

== Geography ==
The Sierra de los Agustinos are volcanic mountains which rise from the Bajío, a high plain. The Sierra is in the basin of the Lerma River, which runs south and west of the range. The main mass of the Trans-Mexican Volcanic Belt lies to the south and southeast.

The volcanic rocks which make up the Sierra are porous and highly fractured, and the Agustinos Aquifer is important source of groundwater in the adjacent lowlands. The range has deposits of non-metallic minerals including as opal, perlite, kaolin, and silica sand.

== Flora and fauna ==
The natural vegetation includes tropical deciduous forest at lower elevation, and oak forest at higher elevation. Characteristic trees include palo dulce (Eysenhardtia polystachya) tepeguaje (Lysiloma sp), oak (Quercus spp.), and pinqüica (Arctostaphylos pungens). 531 species of plants have been recorded within the protected natural area.

The Sierra is an important habitat for wildlife. 29 mammal species, 145 bird species, 16 reptile species, and three species of amphibians have been recorded in the Sierra. Native mammals include the bobcat (Lynx rufus), ringtail (Bassariscus astutus), white-nosed coati (Nasua narica), raccoon (Procyon lotor), Mexican long-nosed bat (Leptonycteris nivalis), and Saussure's shrew (Sorex saussurei). Native birds include Swainson's hawk (Buteo swainsoni), Mexican falcon (Falco mexicanus), brown-backed solitaire (Myadestes occidentalis). Reptiles include the boa constrictor (Boa constrictor) and black-tailed rattlesnake (Crotalus molossus). The Sierra is part of the annual migration route of the monarch butterfly (Danaus plexippus) between eastern North America and the butterflies' wintering grounds in the mountains of Michoacán and Mexico states to the south.

== Conservation ==
The Sierra de los Agustinos was designated a sustainable use area in 2002. It has an area of 191.65 km^{2}.
