= Coroneo =

- City & Municipality
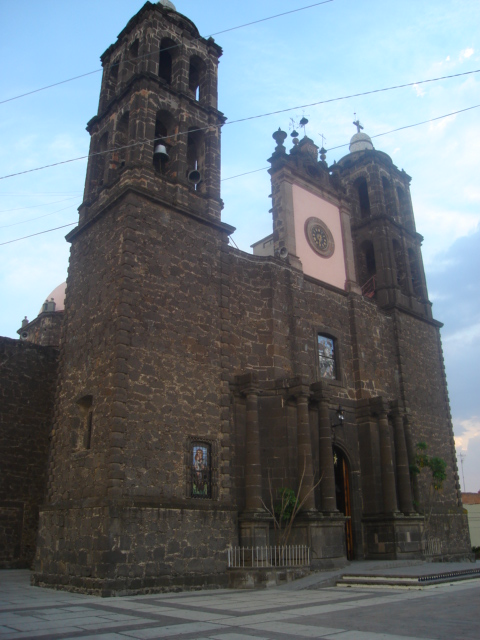
- The parish church of St James the Apostle

- Location of Coroneo in Guanajuato
- Coordinates: 20.198°N 100.365°W
- Country: Mexico
- State: Guanajuato

Area
  - Total: 122.90 km^{2} (47.45 sq mi)

Population (2020)
  - Total: 11,083
  - Density: 90.179/km^{2} (233.56/sq mi)
- Time zone: UTC−6 (CST)
- Website: coroneo.gob.mx

Coroneo is a Mexican town and municipality located in the state of Guanajuato. The municipality has an area of 122.90 square kilometres (0.40% of the surface of the state) and is bordered to the north and the east by the state of Querétaro, to the south by the state of Michoacán, and to the west by Jerécuaro. The municipality had 11,083 inhabitants at the 2020 census.

In pre-Columbian times the area was an important center of Chupícuaro culture, one of the oldest in Mesoamerica, who knew the region as "Place of abundant grain, medicinal plants and creepers."

Its current name is of Otomi origin and means "Place between two hills."

The names of current local government officials are listed on the town's website.

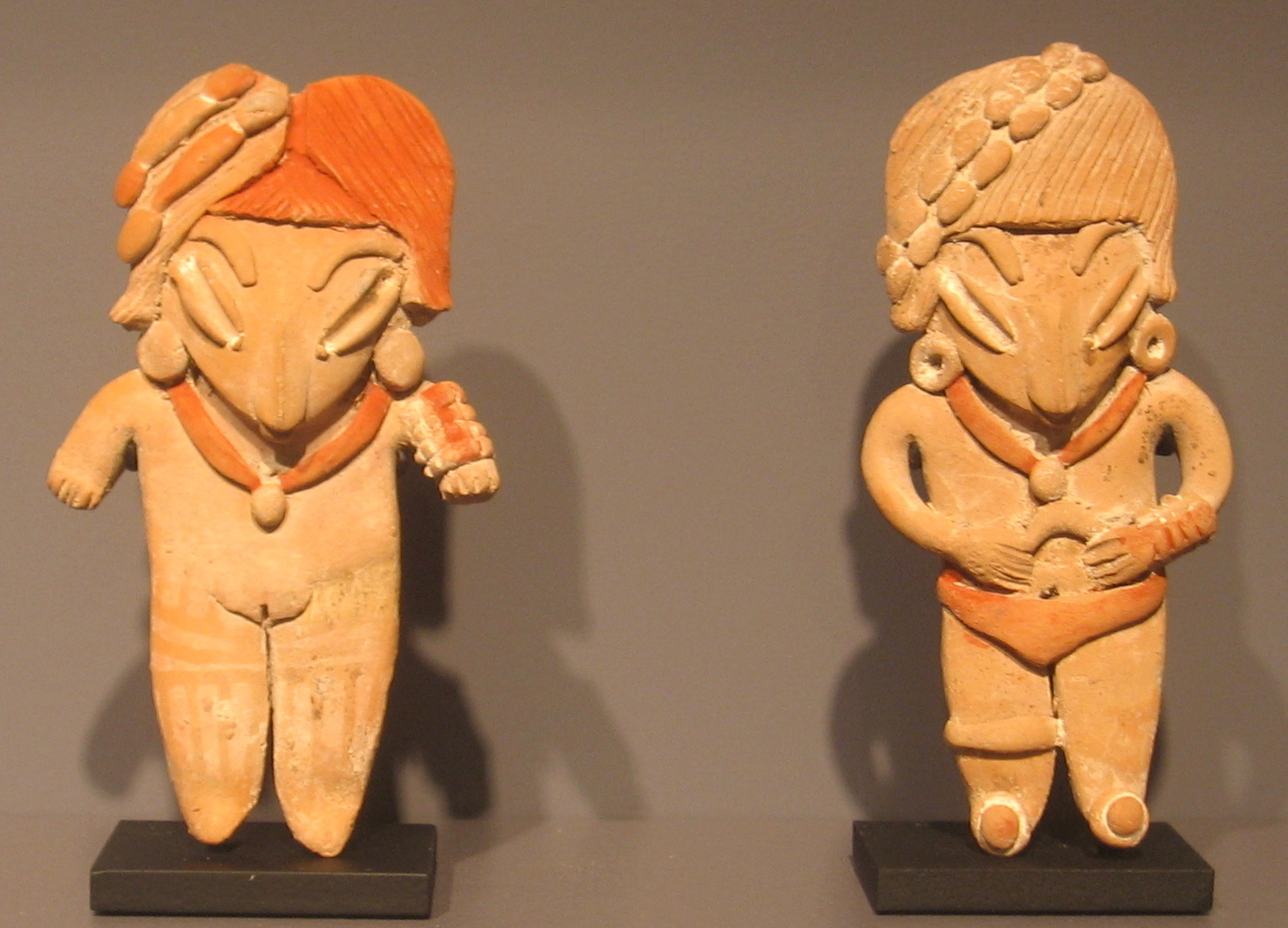
Two Chupicuaro culture ceramic figurines, 500—0 B.C.

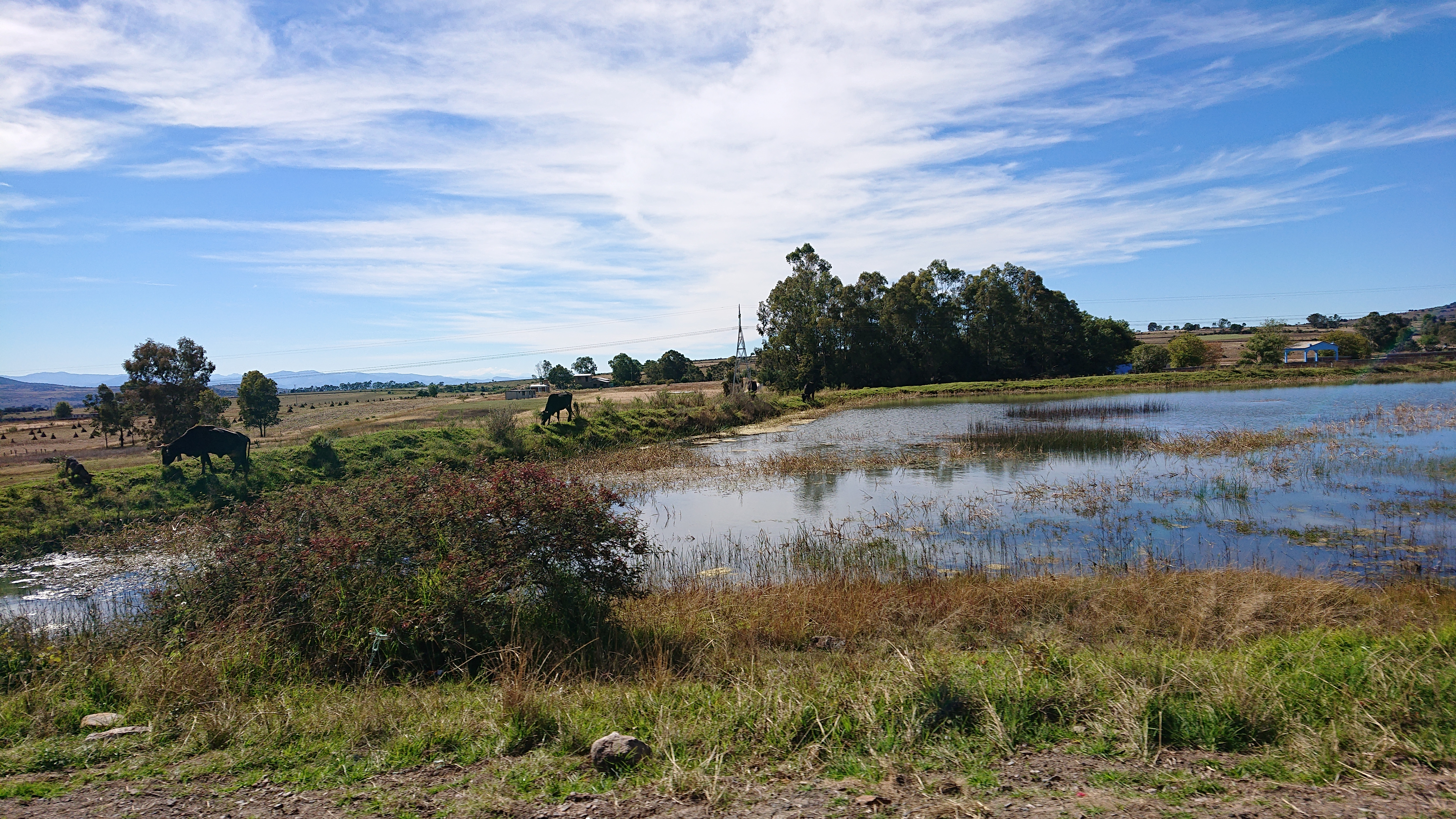
Rainwater captured for cattle and crops

== Climate ==
Climate data for Coroneo (1991–2020 normals, extremes 1962–present)
Month	Jan	Feb	Mar	Apr	May	Jun	Jul	Aug	Sep	Oct	Nov	Dec	Year
Record high °C (°F)	36 (97)	37 (99)	37 (99)	35 (95)	39 (102)	34.5 (94.1)	33 (91)	32 (90)	32 (90)	33 (91)	34 (93)	29.5 (85.1)	39 (102)
Mean daily maximum °C (°F)	22.7 (72.9)	24.1 (75.4)	26.1 (79.0)	28.0 (82.4)	28.5 (83.3)	26.5 (79.7)	24.3 (75.7)	24.4 (75.9)	24.0 (75.2)	23.9 (75.0)	23.7 (74.7)	23.3 (73.9)	25.0 (77.0)
Daily mean °C (°F)	13.1 (55.6)	14.2 (57.6)	16.1 (61.0)	18.0 (64.4)	19.3 (66.7)	18.9 (66.0)	17.7 (63.9)	17.7 (63.9)	17.3 (63.1)	16.4 (61.5)	15.0 (59.0)	13.6 (56.5)	16.4 (61.5)
Mean daily minimum °C (°F)	3.6 (38.5)	4.2 (39.6)	6.1 (43.0)	8.0 (46.4)	10.0 (50.0)	11.3 (52.3)	11.1 (52.0)	11.0 (51.8)	10.7 (51.3)	8.9 (48.0)	6.2 (43.2)	3.9 (39.0)	7.9 (46.2)
Record low °C (°F)	−5 (23)	−5 (23)	−3 (27)	1.5 (34.7)	1 (34)	1 (34)	1 (34)	2.5 (36.5)	1 (34)	−0.5 (31.1)	−4 (25)	−5.5 (22.1)	−5.5 (22.1)
Average precipitation mm (inches)	11.6 (0.46)	11.0 (0.43)	18.7 (0.74)	15.4 (0.61)	44.1 (1.74)	109.2 (4.30)	133.0 (5.24)	115.1 (4.53)	107.5 (4.23)	46.4 (1.83)	14.8 (0.58)	5.2 (0.20)	632.0 (24.88)
Average rainy days	2.1	2.0	2.3	2.5	6.0	11.5	15.2	13.1	10.9	6.1	2.2	1.0	74.9
Source: Servicio Meteorológico Nacional
