= Tarandacuao =

Municipality in Guanajuato, Mexico

Coordinates: 20°00′N 100°32′W

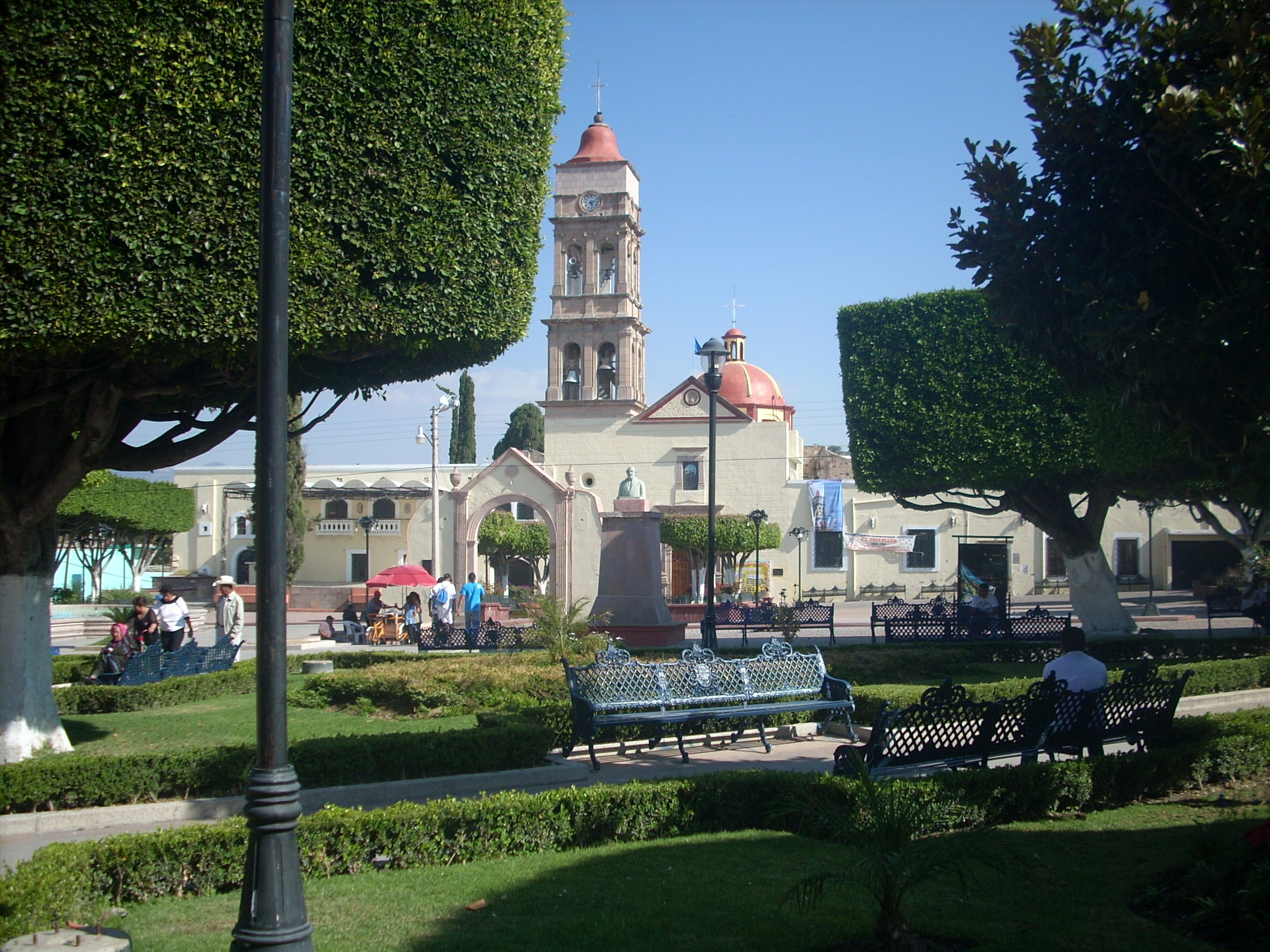
The parish church and central square in Tarandacuao, Guanajuato.

Tarandacuao is a Mexican city (and municipality) located in the lowlands of the state of Guanajuato. The municipality has an area of 117.39 square kilometres, (0.31% of the surface of the state) and is bordered to the north and east by Jerécuaro, to the south by the state of Michoacán, and to the west by Acámbaro. The municipality had 11,583 inhabitants according to the 2005 census. Outlying communities found in Tarandacuao include La Purísima, San Juan De Dios, San José de Hidalgo, San Antonio, El Tocuz, San felipe and La Virgen.

The name of the municipality is of Purépecha origin and means "Place where the water is born," a possible reference to the Lerma River, which runs through the region.

== Climate ==
Climate data for Tarandacuao (1991–2020 normals, extremes 1941–2018)
Month	Jan	Feb	Mar	Apr	May	Jun	Jul	Aug	Sep	Oct	Nov	Dec	Year
Record high °C (°F)	31.1 (88.0)	34 (93)	37.2 (99.0)	40 (104)	41 (106)	39 (102)	38 (100)	36.7 (98.1)	36 (97)	35 (95)	33.3 (91.9)	32.9 (91.2)	41 (106)
Mean daily maximum °C (°F)	24.3 (75.7)	26.9 (80.4)	29.5 (85.1)	31.1 (88.0)	32.3 (90.1)	30.9 (87.6)	28.2 (82.8)	28.8 (83.8)	28.1 (82.6)	27.8 (82.0)	26.7 (80.1)	25.3 (77.5)	28.3 (82.9)
Daily mean °C (°F)	14.0 (57.2)	16.0 (60.8)	18.6 (65.5)	20.8 (69.4)	22.6 (72.7)	22.4 (72.3)	20.6 (69.1)	20.7 (69.3)	20.2 (68.4)	18.6 (65.5)	16.3 (61.3)	14.7 (58.5)	18.8 (65.8)
Mean daily minimum °C (°F)	3.7 (38.7)	5.1 (41.2)	7.7 (45.9)	10.6 (51.1)	12.9 (55.2)	13.8 (56.8)	12.9 (55.2)	12.7 (54.9)	12.3 (54.1)	9.5 (49.1)	5.8 (42.4)	4.2 (39.6)	9.3 (48.7)
Record low °C (°F)	−8.9 (16.0)	−5.6 (21.9)	−3.5 (25.7)	1.8 (35.2)	4 (39)	4 (39)	4.4 (39.9)	6.7 (44.1)	2 (36)	−2.2 (28.0)	−7 (19)	−7.8 (18.0)	−8.9 (16.0)
Average precipitation mm (inches)	12.1 (0.48)	8.6 (0.34)	8.8 (0.35)	11.1 (0.44)	38.4 (1.51)	105.8 (4.17)	158.0 (6.22)	167.2 (6.58)	147.9 (5.82)	59.8 (2.35)	14.9 (0.59)	3.6 (0.14)	736.2 (28.98)
Average rainy days	2.5	1.4	1.8	2.3	5.5	11.7	16.8	15.3	12.5	6.5	2.4	1.3	80.0
Source: Servicio Meteorológico Nacional

== Official website ==
- Tarandacuau, GTO (in Spanish)
