= Jerécuaro =

Municipality in Guanajuato, Mexico

Coordinates: 20°09′02″N 100°30′37″W

- Municipality
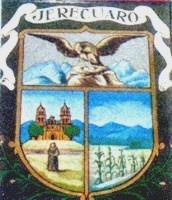
- Coat of arms

- Location in Guanajuato Jerécuaro (Mexico)
- Country: Mexico
- State: Guanajuato
- Demonym: (in Spanish)
- Time zone: UTC−6 (CST)

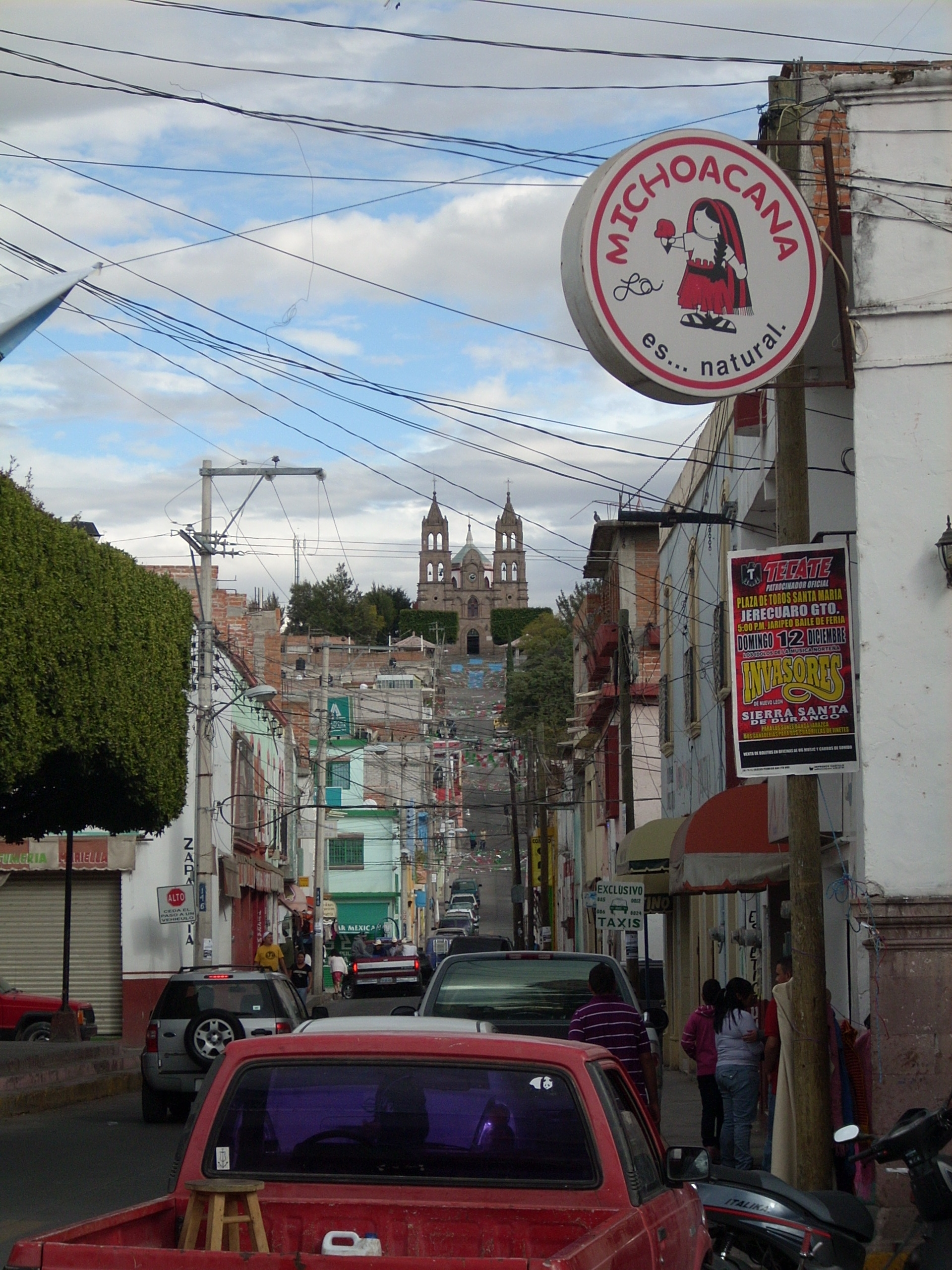
Jerécuaro city street scene in 2011, with the Guadalupe Sanctuary of El Calvario on the horizon.

Jerécuaro is a Mexican city (and municipality) located in the lowlands of the state of Guanajuato. The municipality has an area of 828.3 square kilometres (2.7% of the surface of the state) and is bordered to the north by Apaseo el Alto, to the east by Coroneo and the state of Querétaro, to the south by Tarandacuao, to the southwest with Acámbaro, and to the northwest with Tarimoro. The municipality had 55,311 inhabitants according to the 2005 census. The municipal president of Jerécuaro and its many smaller outlying communities is C.Jaime García Cardona.

Jerécuaro Township is located south of the state of Guanajuato. Its boundaries are defined as follows:

North : Apaseo el Alto South : Tarandacuao East: Coroneo West: Tarimoro Northwest: Tarimoro Northeast : Querétaro Southwest: Acambaro Southeast: Michoacán Jerécuaro is connected to major cities of the entity that will provide optimal geographic location for business and tourist activities.

The various roads to cities of great importance to the municipality placed in a prime strategic location for investment:

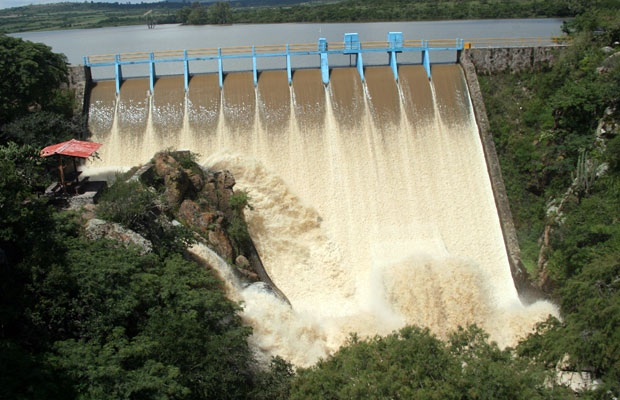
Presa de Jerécuaro

== Communities ==
- El Agostadero
- Altamira
- El Arbolito
- Arroyo Hondo de Puruagua
- Arroyo Hondo del Fresno
- El Banco
- La Barranca
- Benítez
- La Cajeta
- La Campana
- Candelas
- Las Canoas
- La Cantera
- El Carrizo
- Casas Blancas
- La Ceja
- Cerritos de SanJuan
- Cerrito de la Cruz
- Cerro Prieto
- El Chilarillo
- Cieneguilla de Alzati
- El Clarín
- Corrales de la Ordeña
- Las Crucitas
- La Cuchilla
- El Cucurucho
- Cueva de San Isidro
- Cueva de Puruagua
- La Enredadora
- La Esquina
- La Estancia
- Estanzuela de Razo
- Estanzuela de Romero
- La Finca
- El Fresno
- El Gatal
- La Haciendita de la Ordeña
- El Huitzache
- Jiménez
- Joya de Sánchez
- Joya de Puruagua
- Joyas de Clarín
- El Juguete
- Lagunilla de los Agustinos
- Lagunilla del Clarín
- Lagunilla de Puruagua
- Llanos de San Francisco
- Loma Blanca
- La Loma
- Luz de Juárez
- Luz de Peña
- Manzanares del Fresno
- Mesa del Tepozan
- La Mina
- Mora de Ruices
- Moras de Tacambarillo
- Moras del Capulín
- La Morita
- El Novillo
- Ojo de Agua de la Ordeña
- Ojo de Agua de Mendoza
- Ojo Seco
- Las Palmas
- Palos Colorados
- La Pastora
- Petemoro
- Piedras de Lumbre
- Pilas de Puruagua
- Pilas de Salitrera
- Pilas del Sauz del Salto Peña
- La Poza
- La Providencia
- Puerta del Sauz de Puruagua
- Puertecito de Puruagua
- Puerto de Sabanilla
- Puriantzicuaro
- Purísima de Cervantes
- Purísima de la Barranca
- Purísima del Zapote
- Puruagua
- Puruaguita
- Rancho de Guadalupe
- Rancho de Nieves
- Rancho Nuevo
- EI Refugio
- El Rodeo
- El Rosario
- Los Ruices
- La Sabanilla
- La Salirera
- El Saltillo
- Salto de Peña
- San Agusín
- San Antonio Corrales
- San Antonio de la Presa
- San Antonio del Varal
- San Felipe
- San Ignacio
- San Isidro
- San José de Peña
- San Juan de Peña
- San Lorenzo
- San Lucas
- San Miguel del Salto
- San Pablo
- San Pedro de los Agustinos
- Santa Isabel
- Santa María
- Santa Rosa
- Santa Teresa de Tacambarillo
- Santa Teresa del Fresno
- Sarampión
- Saucito
- La Soledad
- Tacambarillo
- Tanquecito de la Ordeña
- Tejocote de Purianzicuaro
- Tejocote de Puruagua
- El Tepozán
- El Terrero
- Tierras Coloradas
- La Tomasa
- El Vallecillo
- La Virgen
- Hierbabuena
- Zapote del salto de Peña
- Zetemaye
- Zomayo

== History ==
The origin of this community is pre-Hispanic, but was subjected to the Spanish Crown evangelized by the Indian chief Nicolas San Luis Montañés. Its legal foundation dates from 1572, under the administration of Bishop Fray Juan Medina Rincón, who erected the parish along the lines of what was done elsewhere Father Vasco de Quiroga. It was called San Miguel Jerécuaro in a file consisting of 1852 we realize that the municipality had that name. Jerécuaro, meaning “Place like home”. In 1910, at the time of the Revolution, the city was the seat of several revolutionary groups and federal troops of the Diaz government. In 1928, at the time of the Cristero uprising, was stationed an infantry battalion of the federal army, in a building located on the street that carries the name of Fray Angel Juárez. In the contours of the population many battles were staged. The city of Jerécuaro and Guadalupe Sanctuary at El Calvario (Calvary).

In 1910, at the time of the Revolution, the city was the seat of several revolutionary groups and federal troops of the Diaz's government. In 1928, at the time of the Cristero uprising, was stationed an infantry battalion of the federal army, in a building located on the street that carries the name of Fray Angel Juárez. In the contours of the population many battles were staged.

== Geography ==
=== Climate ===
Climate data for Jerécuaro (1991–2020 normals, extremes 1923–present)
Month	Jan	Feb	Mar	Apr	May	Jun	Jul	Aug	Sep	Oct	Nov	Dec	Year
Record high °C (°F)	38 (100)	35 (95)	38.5 (101.3)	39 (102)	37.5 (99.5)	38 (100)	39 (102)	38 (100)	33 (91)	32 (90)	32 (90)	32 (90)	39 (102)
Mean daily maximum °C (°F)	24.0 (75.2)	26.3 (79.3)	28.6 (83.5)	30.6 (87.1)	31.3 (88.3)	29.2 (84.6)	26.9 (80.4)	26.8 (80.2)	26.2 (79.2)	25.9 (78.6)	25.2 (77.4)	24.3 (75.7)	27.1 (80.8)
Daily mean °C (°F)	13.5 (56.3)	15.5 (59.9)	17.5 (63.5)	19.8 (67.6)	21.6 (70.9)	21.4 (70.5)	20.1 (68.2)	19.9 (67.8)	19.5 (67.1)	18.0 (64.4)	15.8 (60.4)	14.3 (57.7)	18.1 (64.6)
Mean daily minimum °C (°F)	3.1 (37.6)	4.7 (40.5)	6.5 (43.7)	9.0 (48.2)	11.9 (53.4)	13.6 (56.5)	13.3 (55.9)	13.1 (55.6)	12.8 (55.0)	10.8 (51.4)	6.4 (43.5)	4.2 (39.6)	9.1 (48.4)
Record low °C (°F)	−7 (19)	−6 (21)	−3 (27)	0 (32)	1.2 (34.2)	1.5 (34.7)	4 (39)	5 (41)	0 (32)	0 (32)	−5 (23)	−5.5 (22.1)	−7 (19)
Average precipitation mm (inches)	9.9 (0.39)	12.5 (0.49)	10.8 (0.43)	8.9 (0.35)	42.5 (1.67)	136.8 (5.39)	176.2 (6.94)	156.3 (6.15)	131.2 (5.17)	46.2 (1.82)	11.8 (0.46)	4.5 (0.18)	747.6 (29.43)
Average rainy days	2.3	2.1	2.4	3.2	8.1	13.5	18.2	16.8	14.2	6.9	2.8	1.7	92.2
Source: Servicio Meteorológico Nacional

== Notable people ==
Jose Aguilar and Maya, (1897-1966)- Politician and governor of Guanajuato

Glorian Rangel, Real Estate Agent in Madison, WI

== Anniversary and celebration ==
=== 15 and 16 September ===
As in much of our national territory, Jerécuaro the traditional of “ Independencia”(Independence Day) also known as “El Grito de Dolores”, is carried out on the balcony of the town hall, like the kermes (Carnaval) installed and fireworks are burned. The next day, the 16th, a parade is done by schools of different educational levels through the streets of the town. The streets are packed with people, all cheering and screaming,“Viva Mexico”, “Viva Miguel Hidalgo y Costilla”, “Viva la Independencia”.

=== September 23 ===
Held since 1994, the founding of Jerécuaro, although recently created this celebration, a parade takes place to commemorate this occasion.

=== September 29 ===
It celebrates “The Patron Saint of Jerécuaro”, San Miguel Archangel, the fair with rides, rodeos, Mexican dishes, Eucharistic celebrations and dances installed. Jerecuarenses attend these parties living in other parts of the country.

=== November 27 ===
Jerecuarenses celebrate when the first rock was placed on the dam. The made this dam to provide irrigation to their crops. It is traditional for people to go with your family and friends to eat around the dam. Among the traditional dishes that are eaten are tamales de ceniza (tamales of ash), and roasted pork meat with red chile.

=== December 12 to 15 ===
It celebrates The Virgin of Guadalupe, starts with happy birthday on the 12th, for the festivities the fair with rides, rodeos, Mexican dishes, Eucharistic celebrations and dances installed. A special mass is given before all the events. The mass takes place at “ El Calvario”. The festival culminates on the 15th with the Coronation of the Virgin in the Sanctuary of Calvary.
