= Apaseo el Alto =

- Coat of arms

- Location within Guanajuato Location within Mexico
- Coordinates: 20°27′N 100°37′W
- Country: Mexico
- State: Guanajuato

Government
  - Mayor: María del Carmen Ortiz Terrazas (MoReNa)

Area
  - Land: 377.42 km^{2} (145.72 sq mi)

Population (2010)
  - Total: 64,443
- Website: (in Spanish)

Apaseo el Alto is a Mexican city and municipality located in the state of Guanajuato. The municipality has an area of 491.81 square kilometres (1.6% of the surface of the state) and is bordered to the north by Apaseo el Grande, to the east by the state of Querétaro, to the south by Jerécuaro and Tarimoro, and to the northwest by Celaya. The municipality had a population of 56,817 inhabitants according to the 2005 census.

In pre-Columbian times Apaseo (Apatzeo) was known as Atlayahualco or "place of where water flows" by the Otomí people who lived in the region.

The municipal president of Apaseo el Alto and its many smaller outlying communities, which include San Juan del Llanito, San Bartolo and many others, is Dr. Miguel Ángel Sánchez Escutia.

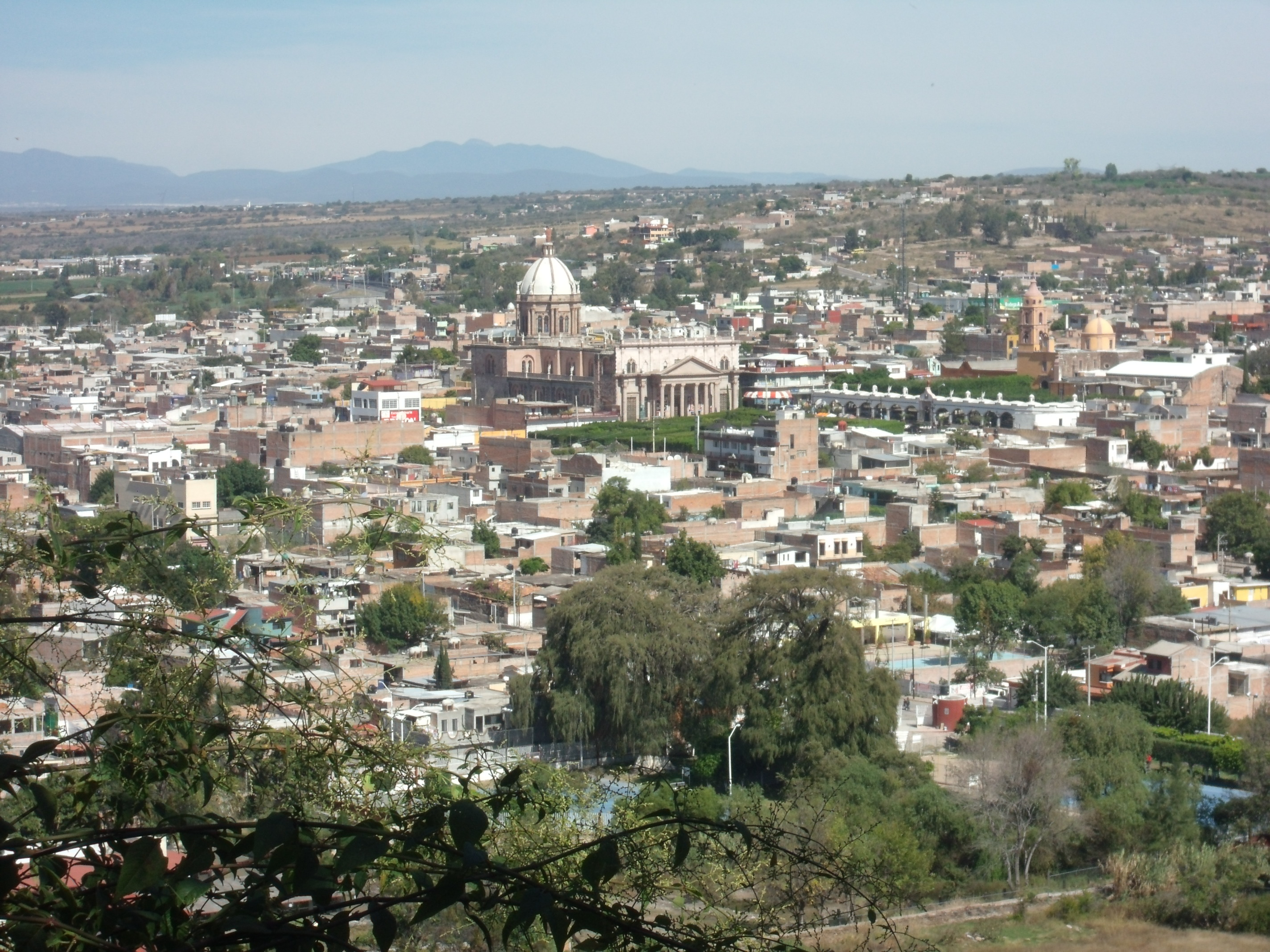
Apaseo el Alto

== Official website ==
- Apaseo el Alto(in Spanish)
