= Comonfort =

Town and municipality in Guanajuato, Mexico

Coordinates: 20°43′N 100°46′W

- Municipality
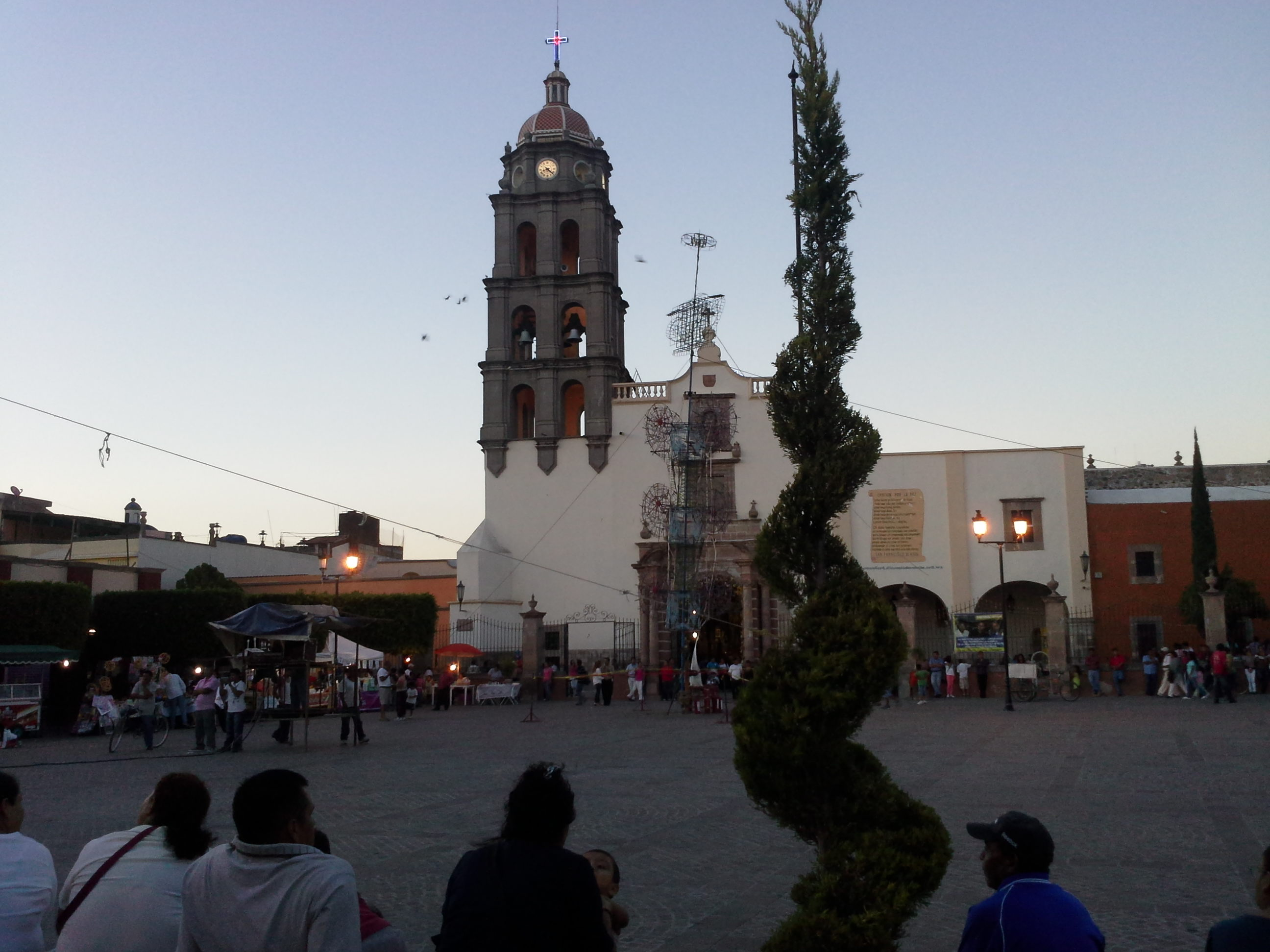
- Temple of San Francisco in Comonfort

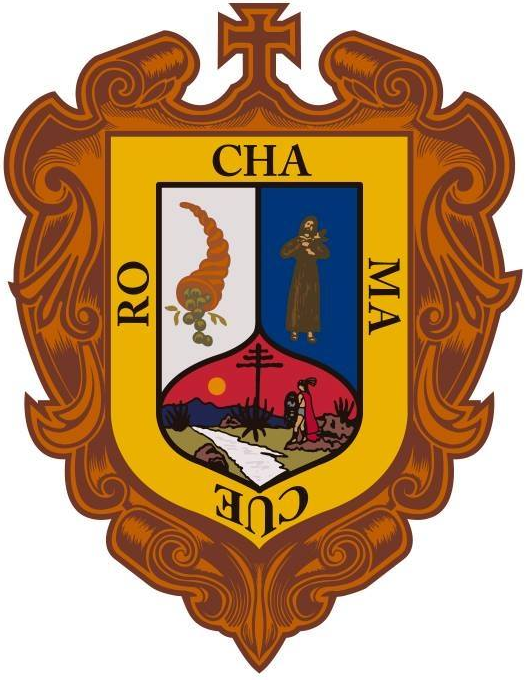
- Coat of arms

- Location within Guanajuato Location within Mexico
- Country: Mexico
- State: Guanajuato

Population (2020)
  - Total: 82,216
  - Seat: 24,228
- Time zone: UTC-6 (Central Standard Time)

Comonfort is a Mexican town and municipality in the state of Guanajuato, declared a Pueblo Mágico since 2018. It was named after Mexican general and President Ignacio Comonfort. The municipality has an area of 485.90 square kilometres (1.60% of the surface of the state) and is bordered to the north and northeast by San Miguel de Allende, to the east by the state of Querétaro, to the south and southwest by, Apaseo el Grande, Celaya and Santa Cruz de Juventino Rosas, respectively . The municipality had a population of 67,642 inhabitants according to the 2005 census.

In pre-Columbian times the area of what is today Comonfort was known as Chamacuero, a word of Purépecha origin that means "To fall down" or "Place of ruins."
