= Panales Jamaica =

Coordinates: 20.2956°N 100.8231°W

Panales Jamaica (Also known as Cañones) is a small town in the Tarimoro Municipality of Guanajuato, Mexico. It lies between the cities of Celaya and Salvatierra. It is in El Bajío, a valley region of central Mexico. It has mainly an agricultural economy, but it is beginning to industrialize thanks to the highway that passes through the very middle of Cañones. It has a population of about 3,000 people. It was founded in the late 16th century. It has begun to develop intensely over the past decade making it the second largest town in its area. Many of the people of this town have family in Dallas, Los Angeles, Detroit, Illinois, and scattered all over the U.S.A. The lands in and around Tarimoro are very fertile and are irrigated by a canal that runs from a local dam called "La Presa del Cubo".

== Education ==
This town has a simple education system. It includes a Pre-Elementary School, an Elementary School, and a Middle School. There are 3 years of Pre-Elementary education, 6 years of Elementary education, and 3 years of Middle School education. If a person wishes to continue on to high school they must travel to the CBTIS of Tarimoro where they would spend three years. The Elementary school called Felipe Carrillo Puerto and it is a very interesting school surrounded by bushes and trees and a very beautiful garden.

== Employment ==
Most people of Caňones are involved in growing cash crops. Recently, people have started to lean to employment in the city of Celaya, which is about 30 kilometers away. These people usually work in factories in the industrial zone of the city. Other people own businesses in the town such as tortilla shops, home improvement shops, small convenient stores, butcher shops, bakeries, shoe stores, produce shops, barber shops, food stands, and every Thursday there is a flea market in the main street.

== Points of interest ==
There are a few points of interests in this town such as the garden. The garden is a small area full of trees and grass with benches where people can go and relax. It was only made 3 years ago. There is also a soccer field where the local soccer team, Club Cañones, plays matches every Sunday for people to watch. The small mountain of Cañones is a very popular place to go walking or jogging. Every afternoon you can see a number of people walking or jogging for exercise. The Thursday flea market also attracts a huge number of people. You can find anything from clothes to CDs/DVDs to Ice cream to electronics to fruit/vegetables to woodwork.

== Areas ==
There are 5 different areas in Panales Jamaica. These are "La Calzada", "Arriba", "Abajo","La Colonia", and "la colonial de los Alvarez".

== Important people ==
In politics; President of Tarimoro in the 1940s. Bacilio Espino. Ismael Torres in the19 80s.

== Other facts ==
It is near "panales galera" on the east side and la "moncada", south side are Salvatirra, which is a big city, also we find a lot of more small towns, to mention one of those are, la Calera la Estancia and many more. Going northeast we find Celaya.
