= Acámbaro =

Acámbaro Akambarhu San Francisco de Acámbaro
- City and municipality
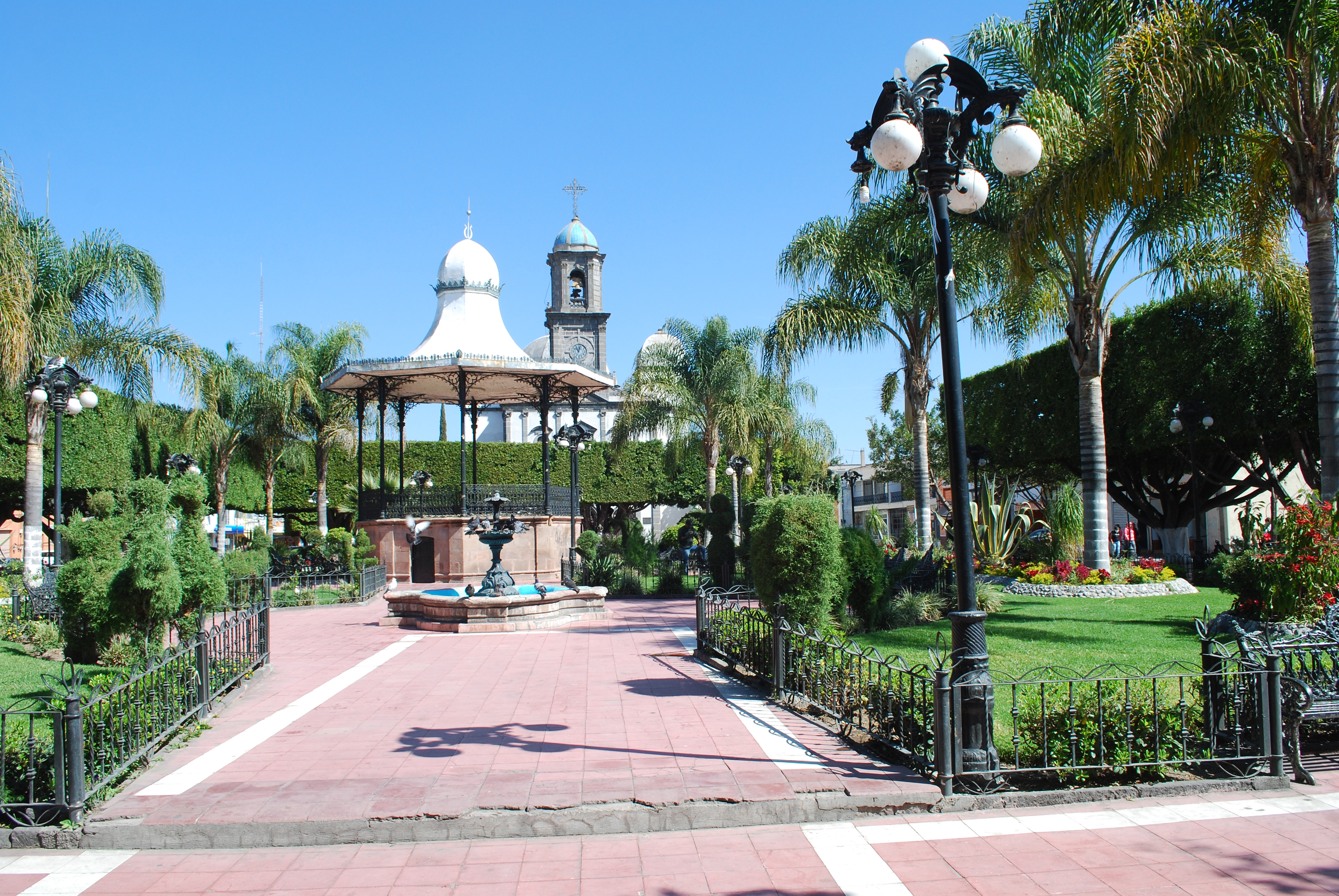
- Main plaza in Acámbaro

- Coat of arms
- Nickname: The city of bread
- Motto: With Acambaro, Guanajuato was born
- Location in Guanajuato Acámbaro (Mexico)
- Coordinates: 20.03250°N 100.72068°W
- Country: Mexico
- State: Guanajuato
- Municipality: Acámbaro
- Founded: 1526
- Signing of ratification: 1535
- Founder: Don Nicolás de San Luis Montañés

Government
  - Mayor: Claudia Silva Campos
  - Secretary: Gerardo Aguilera Torres

Area
  - City: 15.63 km^{2} (6.03 sq mi)
  - Municipality: 877.8 km^{2} (338.9 sq mi)
- Elevation: 1,860 m (6,100 ft)
- Highest elevation: 3,100 m (10,200 ft)
- Lowest elevation: 1,800 m (5,900 ft)

Population (2020 census)
  - City: 56,597
  - Density: 3,621/km^{2} (9,378/sq mi)
  - Municipality: 108,697
  - Municipality density: 123.8/km^{2} (320.7/sq mi)
- Time zone: UTC−6 (CST)
- Postal code: 38600–38787
- Area code: 417
- Website: City of Acambaro

Acámbaro (Otomi: Mä'wada) is a city and municipality in the southeastern corner of the Mexican state of Guanajuato, on the banks of the Lerma River, and the oldest of the 46 municipalities of Guanajuato. Acámbaro was originally a Purépecha settlement which was invaded by the Spanish, and their Otomi allies, in 1526. Acámbaro is noted, as a major railway junction, a local transport hub, and the origin of the nationally famous Acámbaro bread. The 2005 census population of the municipality was 101,762, and that of the city proper 55,082. The municipality covers an area of 877.8 km^{2} (335.01 sq mi) and includes many small outlying communities, the largest of which are Iramuco and Parácuaro.

The municipality of Acámbaro is bordered to the north by Tarimoro and Jerécuaro, to the southeast by Tarandacuao, to the south by the state of Michoacán, and to the west by Salvatierra.

== Geography ==
=== Climate ===
Climate data for Acámbaro (1991–2020 normals, extremes 1937–present)
Month	Jan	Feb	Mar	Apr	May	Jun	Jul	Aug	Sep	Oct	Nov	Dec	Year
Record high °C (°F)	32 (90)	33 (91)	37.2 (99.0)	38.5 (101.3)	40 (104)	39.5 (103.1)	34 (93)	32.5 (90.5)	33 (91)	32.5 (90.5)	33 (91)	32 (90)	40 (104)
Mean daily maximum °C (°F)	24.8 (76.6)	27.3 (81.1)	29.6 (85.3)	31.8 (89.2)	32.2 (90.0)	29.7 (85.5)	27.4 (81.3)	27.3 (81.1)	26.8 (80.2)	27.0 (80.6)	26.3 (79.3)	25.2 (77.4)	28.0 (82.4)
Daily mean °C (°F)	15.4 (59.7)	17.2 (63.0)	19.4 (66.9)	21.8 (71.2)	23.1 (73.6)	22.2 (72.0)	20.6 (69.1)	20.5 (68.9)	20.0 (68.0)	19.1 (66.4)	17.2 (63.0)	15.7 (60.3)	19.4 (66.9)
Mean daily minimum °C (°F)	6.0 (42.8)	7.0 (44.6)	9.2 (48.6)	11.9 (53.4)	14.0 (57.2)	14.8 (58.6)	13.9 (57.0)	13.7 (56.7)	13.2 (55.8)	11.2 (52.2)	8.1 (46.6)	6.1 (43.0)	10.8 (51.4)
Record low °C (°F)	−5 (23)	−2.5 (27.5)	0.9 (33.6)	3.9 (39.0)	7.1 (44.8)	7 (45)	7.5 (45.5)	8 (46)	1 (34)	0.5 (32.9)	−2 (28)	−6 (21)	−6 (21)
Average precipitation mm (inches)	10.0 (0.39)	6.9 (0.27)	12.7 (0.50)	5.7 (0.22)	48.2 (1.90)	118.3 (4.66)	174.0 (6.85)	186.5 (7.34)	140.3 (5.52)	46.4 (1.83)	13.8 (0.54)	4.6 (0.18)	767.4 (30.21)
Average rainy days	2.9	2.2	3.4	4.9	10.6	16.8	21.7	20.4	16.2	9.2	3.8	2.1	114.2
Source: Servicio Meteorológico Nacional

== History ==
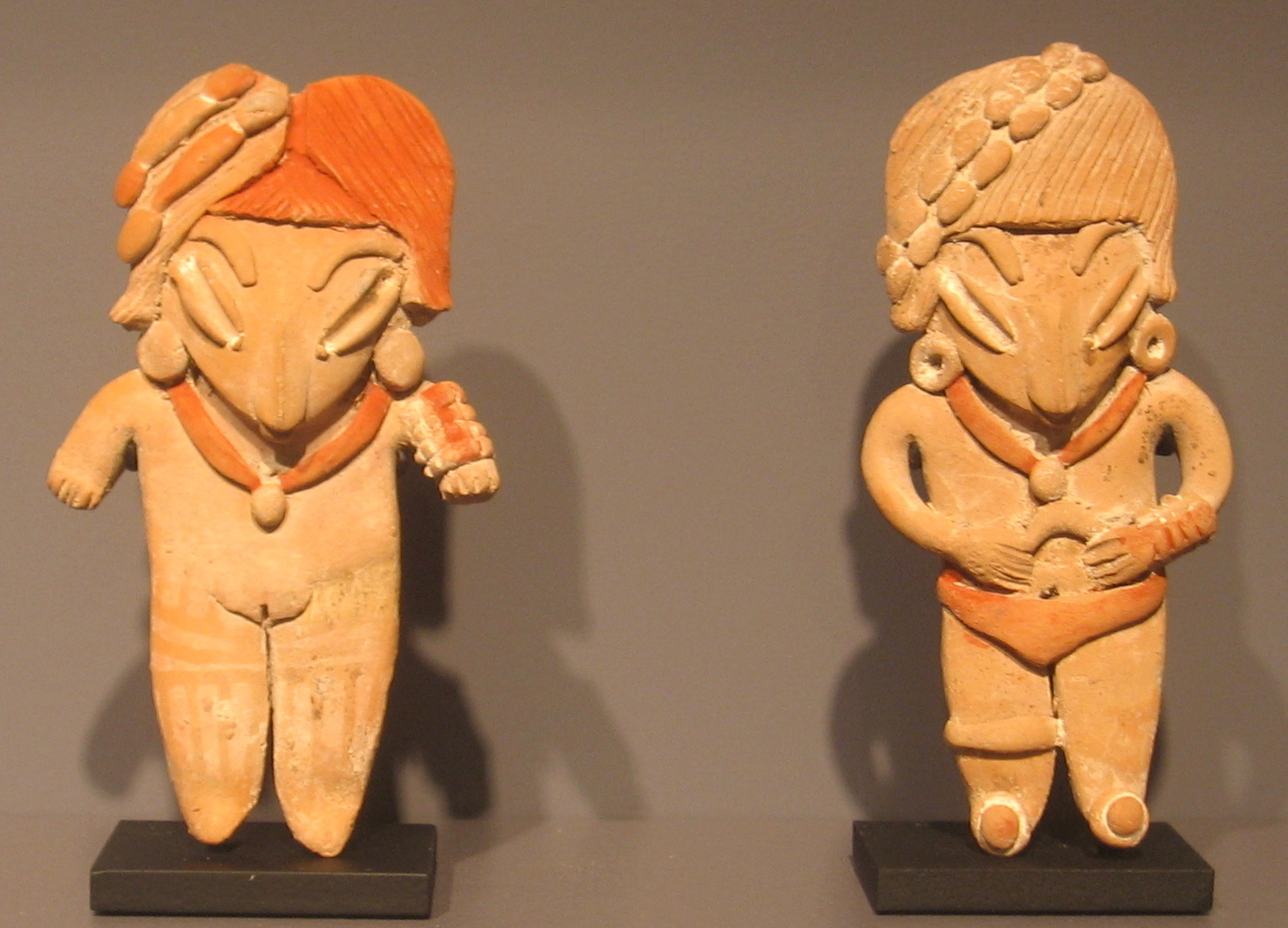
Two Chupicuaro culture ceramic figurines, 500 – 0 B.C.

The name Acámbaro is derived from a Purépechan term meaning place of magueyes. The first inhabitants of this area belonged to the Chupicuaro culture, one of the oldest in Mesoamerica. Their origin is estimated to be from 1200 B.C. In this region there have been valuable archaeological finds of ceramic that are now exhibited at the local museum.

The city was founded on September 19, 1526, by the cacique Don Nicolás de San Luis Montañés, with the name San Francisco de Acámbaro. It was the first Spanish town in what is now the state of Guanajuato. The evangelization process was undertaken by Franciscan friars, who also constructed splendid structures that remain standing today, such as the Templo del Hospital (Hospital Temple), an aqueduct in the Mudéjar style (1527), and a stone bridge over the River Lerma (1750). The first bullfights on the soil of New Spain were held in Acámbaro, and the Fuente Taurina fountain in the city's plaza commemorates the introduction of the sport to Mexico. Acámbaro is the only city in Mexico that has a fully intact colonial-era aqueduct.

The 18th century brought prosperity to Acámbaro. In that time important religious and public buildings were constructed. Several temples, bridges, and houses were left as remnants of the city's colonial architecture.

An important event in the history of Mexican independence took place in Acámbaro. Don Miguel Hidalgo stayed there on October 22, 1810, and brought a ceremony that declared Acámbaro military quarters for the Ejército Grande de América (Grand Army of America). Hidalgo was given the title of Generalísimo de las Américas (Grand General of the Americas). That same day, a parade of eighty thousand insurgents took place, that demonstrated the speed of growth of the movement: one month prior on September 16 just 800 men responded to the Grito de Dolores and raised arms against the Spanish in Dolores Hidalgo.

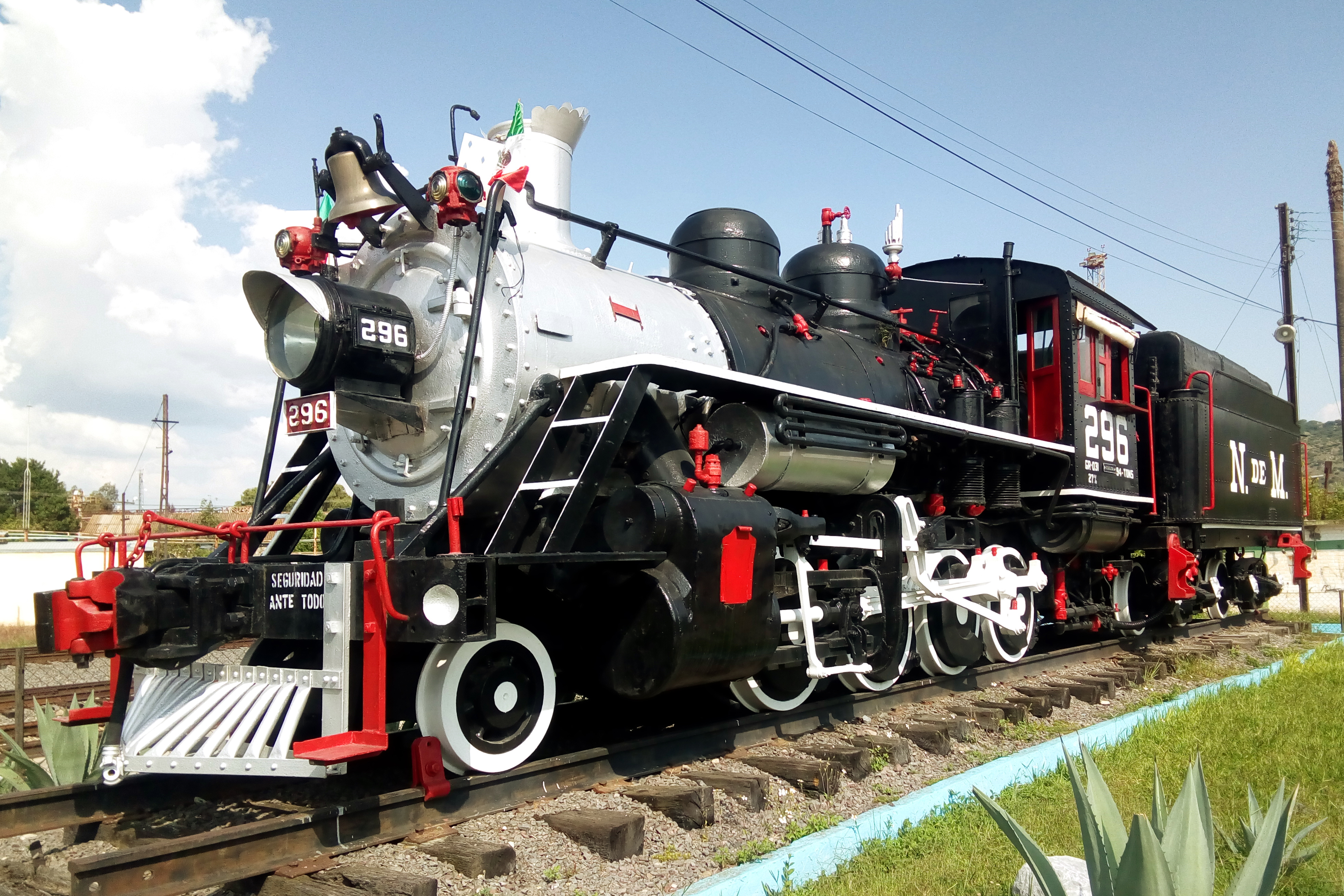
"La Fidelita" steam locomotive.

Because of its strategic location, Acámbaro was the key to the development of the railway in Mexico, and had a major junction, yard and shop facility for the National Railways of Mexico (The rail lines are now owned by Kansas City Southern de Mexico). Acámbaro was the home of the only full scale locomotive repair facility in Latin America that was capable of constructing steam locomotives. During 1944 Acámbaro's mechanical workshop built La Fidelita 296, a steam engine that is a symbol of a time in history of the Acambarense society. La Fidelita is now on display as the cornerstone exhibit of Acámbaro's railway museum. Another souvenir of Acámbaro's age of steam is a large model locomotive that sits on an elevated platform in the center of a major highway intersection east of the city. The model engine was originally intended to be placed in a church as a thanks by railway workers to the Virgen del Refugio (patron saint of the city) for bringing prosperity and jobs to Acámbaro, however, the model would not fit through the doorway of the church. Consequently, it was decided to mount the model outdoors.

Acámbaro has been notable as a point of controversy in the field of archeology as the source of the Acámbaro figures, a collection of about 32,000 clay figurines discovered by German archaeologist Waldemar Julsrud in 1944 near the city's most prominent landmark, the Cerro del Toro (Bull Hill). The figures are claimed to be hoaxes, as some of the figurines resembled dinosaurs (thus implying that man and dinosaurs co-existed) and their discovery is used by some as evidence to support creationism. Many of the Julsrud finds are now on display at the Museo Waldemar Julsrud.

Less controversial archeological artifacts are on display at the Museo de Chupícuaro (also known as Museo Fray Bernardo Padilla), documenting the history of the Chupícuaro people, and the Museo Local de Acámbaro, which has over 4000 relics relating to local Mesoamerican cultures. The Museo Local also contains paintings related to colonial Mexico and the war of independence.

Pan de Acámbaro (Acambaro bread), Acámbaro's most famous culinary export, is a bakery product similar to Jewish Challah (It is supposed that the similarity is not coincidental). The largest of the six city bakeries devoted to the production of Pan de Acámbaro is Tio Sams (Uncle Sam's), which claims credit for its invention. Photos of Acámbaro's annual bread fair
