= Síndico Procurador =

Local administrative office in New Spain

Síndico Procurador was a Spanish term for a colonial city attorney or municipal corporation counsel used in the former Viceroyalty of New Spain based in Spanish colonial México. It was used to identify the local administrative and judicial position within a town council, corresponding to a present-day city attorney or corporation counsel.

== Definition ==
The main governing body or council of a colonial Spanish town or city within Viceroyalty of New Spain was the Ayuntamiento. It functioned as the town council, and had a varying range of administrative and judicial duties. The number of members of the council was generally based on the population of the municipality.

Members serving on the council were:

- 1 − 2 alcaldes (mayors) — If there were two alcaldes, then Alcalde Primero (Alcalde 1) was the mayor as we now them today (2019), or was the municipal administrator of some municipalities, whereas the Alcalde Segundo (Alcalde 2) was the executive mayor or district administrator who also acted as head of the town or city council.
- 4 − 12 regidors (council members).
- 1 Alguacil (sheriff).
- 1 Síndico Procurador (city attorney−corporation counsel).

In colonial Spanish Texas and in Mexican Texas, the word Cabildo was used for the ayuntamientos−councils, and also for the buildings they met within.

== See also ==
- City attorneys
- New Spain
- People from New Spain
- Spanish Texas
- Syndic
