= Tarimoro, Guanajuato =

Settlement in Guanajuato, Mexico

Coordinates: 20°17′19″N 100°45′29″W

Tarimoro
- Country: Mexico
- State: Guanajuato
- Municipality: Tarimoro

Population (2020)
  - Total: 12,426
- Time zone: UTC-6 (Central (US Central))

Tarimoro is the municipal seat of the municipality of Tarimoro in the Mexican state of Guanajuato.

Tarimoro is known for its peanuts and bricks. Every September, they celebrate the saint of the city, a custom in Mexico, San Miguel. They have giant floats and schools from the municipal come and march in honor of the Saint. They also tall costumes where they use to dance around the plaza.

== History ==
The original settlement was a community of Otomi people who were later conquered by the Purépecha. The latter named this place Tarimoro, which means "Place of willows." The town was founded back in the epic of colonization by Don Lucas of San Juan on January 3, 1563. In 1910, its name was changed to Ciudad Obregon Gonzalez, by decree of the state Congress, in honor of the then state governor, Joaquin Gonzalez Obregon. However, the official name was later changed back to Tarimoro.

== Geography ==
Tarimoro is located in Guanajuato. It is bordered to the north by Celaya, to the northwest by Apaseo del Alto, to the west by Jérecuaro, to the south by Acámbaro and to the west by Salvatierra.

Tarimoro represents 1.8% of the area of the State of Guanajuato; this is equal to 366.88 km^{2} (141.65 sq mi). It has 64 residents per square kilometer (166/square mile).

Important localities of this town include La Noria de Gallegos, Panales de Jamaica, La Moncada, Galera de Panales, and Acebuche. San Juan Bautista Cacalote was historically a pueblo of the Cacalote Indians. (Note: Alternate spellings include Calcalote or Chajalote.)

=== Climate ===
The weather is humid with rain in the summer. The average annual temperature is 19.9 °C (68 °F). The average annual rainfall reaches 700 millimeters. The maximum and minimum temperatures are 36 °C (97 °F) and 2 °C (36 °F).

Climate data for Tarimoro, Guanajuato (1991–2020 normals, extremes 1972–2020)
Month	Jan	Feb	Mar	Apr	May	Jun	Jul	Aug	Sep	Oct	Nov	Dec	Year
Record high °C (°F)	35 (95)	35 (95)	38 (100)	39 (102)	42 (108)	40 (104)	39 (102)	39 (102)	38 (100)	40 (104)	36 (97)	35 (95)	42 (108)
Mean daily maximum °C (°F)	23.8 (74.8)	25.9 (78.6)	28.4 (83.1)	30.4 (86.7)	31.1 (88.0)	28.8 (83.8)	26.8 (80.2)	27.0 (80.6)	26.5 (79.7)	26.3 (79.3)	25.2 (77.4)	24.4 (75.9)	27.0 (80.6)
Daily mean °C (°F)	15.0 (59.0)	16.8 (62.2)	19.1 (66.4)	21.2 (70.2)	22.5 (72.5)	21.5 (70.7)	20.1 (68.2)	20.3 (68.5)	19.9 (67.8)	18.8 (65.8)	16.8 (62.2)	15.5 (59.9)	19.0 (66.2)
Mean daily minimum °C (°F)	6.3 (43.3)	7.6 (45.7)	9.8 (49.6)	12.0 (53.6)	13.9 (57.0)	14.3 (57.7)	13.5 (56.3)	13.6 (56.5)	13.4 (56.1)	11.4 (52.5)	8.4 (47.1)	6.7 (44.1)	10.9 (51.6)
Record low °C (°F)	−1 (30)	−5 (23)	0 (32)	5.5 (41.9)	4 (39)	2 (36)	9 (48)	1 (34)	5 (41)	2 (36)	−1 (30)	−3 (27)	−5 (23)
Average precipitation mm (inches)	14.7 (0.58)	13.1 (0.52)	13.1 (0.52)	6.9 (0.27)	34.9 (1.37)	137.1 (5.40)	175.2 (6.90)	168.4 (6.63)	132.4 (5.21)	42.3 (1.67)	12.9 (0.51)	5.4 (0.21)	756.4 (29.78)
Average rainy days	3.5	2.2	3.7	4.0	9.1	14.0	18.0	16.7	14.5	7.3	3.5	2.0	98.5
Source: Servicio Meteorológico Nacional

== Agriculture ==
The main crops are corn, sorghum, peanuts, and sweet potato. Of the 84 hectares (208 acres) sown during the agricultural year of 2000, 75.9% were temporary and 24.1% irrigation.

Livestock was recorded in the following figures:

- Bovine 5,592
- Pork 9,908
- Sheep 1,249
- Caprino 690
