= Servicio Meteorológico Nacional (Mexico) =

Meteorological Service of Mexico

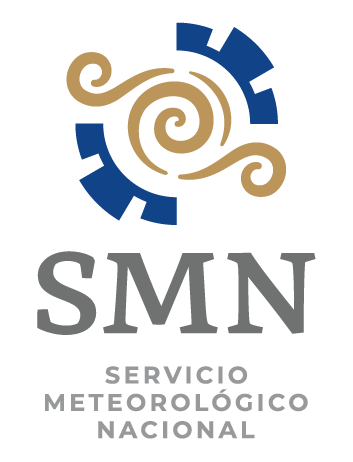

Agency overview
- Formed: 1877
- Preceding agency: Observatorio Meteorológico y Astronómico de México
- Jurisdiction: Mexico
- Headquarters: Mexico
- Agency executive: Jorge Zavala Hidalgo, General Coordinator
- Parent department: Secretariat of Environment and Natural Resources
- Parent agency: National Water Commission
- Website: https://smn.conagua.gob.mx

The Servicio Meteorológico Nacional (SMN; "National Meteorological Service") is Mexico's national weather organization. It collects data and issues forecasts, advisories, and warnings for the entire country.

== History ==
A presidential decree founded El Observatorio Meteorológico y Astrónomico de México (The Meteorological and Astronomical Observatory of Mexico) on February 6, 1877 as part of the Geographic Exploring of the National Territory commission. By 1880, it became an independent agency located at Chapultepec Castle, then encompassing six observatories. In 1901, the Servicio Meteorologia Nacional was formed with 31 sections for each state and 18 independent observatories which reported back to the central office in Tacubaya via telegraph. It joined the World Meteorological Organization in 1947. By 1980, the organization included 72 observatories, of which eight launched weather balloons and radiosondes, and five radars serviced the country. In 1989, it became a subagency of the General de Administracion del Agua.

== Functions of the organization ==
The agency issues forecasts out to five days in the future, hydrological bulletins including recent rainfall, agricultural bulletins, and run their own regional forecast model based upon the MM5. They also issue warnings for intense storms, strong northerlies in the Gulf of Mexico, snowfall, and excessive rainfall. Surface analyses for the region are drawn by the National Hurricane Center which are incorporated onto the Weather Prediction Center analysis and then linked to by SMN on their website. They issue their own tropical cyclone reports that describe the impact of storms on Mexico, which are then relayed to the U.S. National Hurricane Center and the World Meteorological Organization.

== See also ==
- National Weather Service - United States (Note that the United States' NWS issues bulletins and forecasts in Spanish as the "Servicio Meteorológico Nacional")
- World Meteorological Organization
