= Dulce de leche =

Confection from Latin America

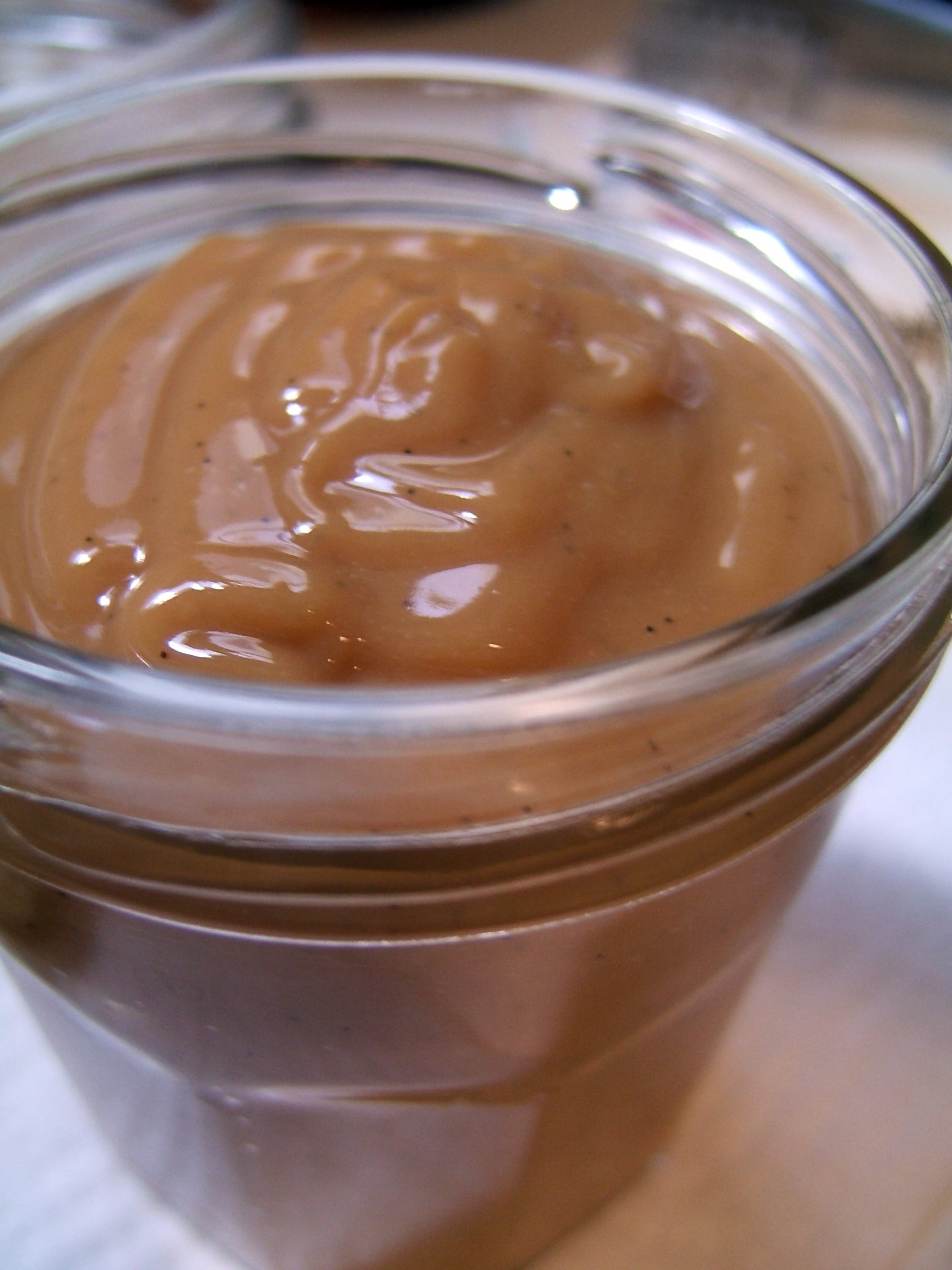
- Alternative names: Caramelized milk, milk candy, milk jam
- Type: Confectionery
- Region or state: Latin America, Poland, Philippines, France
- Main ingredients: Milk, sugar

Dulce de leche, (Note: Spanish: [ˈdulse ðe ˈletʃe, ˈdulθe]) caramelized milk, milk candy, or milk jam is a confection commonly made by heating sugar and milk over several hours. The substance takes on a spreadable, sauce-like consistency and derives its rich flavour and colour from non-enzymatic browning. It is typically used to top or fill other sweet foods.

== Names and similar confections ==
Spanish dulce de leche and Portuguese doce de leite (Portuguese: [ˈdosi dʒi ˈlejtʃi]) mean "sweet [made] of milk". Other names in Spanish include manjar ("delicacy"), arequipe and leche quemada ("burnt milk"); also in Mexico and some Central American countries dulce de leche made with goat's milk is called 'cajeta'. (Note: The term arequipe is used in Colombia and Venezuela, cajeta is used in Mexico, manjar in Chile or manjar blanco is used in Bolivia, Ecuador and Peru.) A famous confection from Mexico is known as cajeta de Celaya.

In the Philippines, dulce de leche made with carabao (water buffalo) milk is called dulce gatas, and is a specialty of Negros Occidental province.

In French, it is called confiture de lait (milk jam). In France, it is traditional in the regions of Normandy and Savoy, where it is commonly served with fromage blanc or crêpes.

The same confectionery is also known as kajmak in Polish cuisine, named after Turkish kaymak, a kind of clotted cream. Kajmak is most commonly used for wafers or the mazurek pie traditionally eaten at Easter.

== History ==
There are various stories about its origin. Some reports say it originated in Indonesia in the 6th century. Argentine historian Daniel Balmaceda considers that it might have originated in the Philippines in the 4th century. Later it would have been brought from the Philippines to Spain, and finally into the Americas. Apocryphal stories also suggest it was brought to the Americas by important historical figures like Napoleon or Argentine general Juan Manuel de Rosas.

Argentine politician Rodolfo Terragno attributed its origin to India, relating it to the sweet dish rabadi, made of milk.

There are records of doce de leite in Minas Gerais, Brazil from 1773.

There are customs reports of importation of manjar into Argentina from Chile in 1693 and 1712. Argentine historian Víctor Ego Ducrot says it originated in the Captaincy General of Chile and would have made its diffusion into Argentina with Army of the Andes in 1817.

Swiss naturalist Johann Rudolph Rengger reports the consumption of dulce de leche in Paraguay in his trip from 1818 to 1825.

Since 1998, at the initiative of the Argentine Center for the Promotion of Dulce de Leche and Related Products, the International Dulce de Leche Day is celebrated every October 11.

In 2003, Argentina attempted to declare dulce de leche as an intangible cultural heritage but countries across South America and Central America objected due to its popularity all over the continent.

== Preparation ==
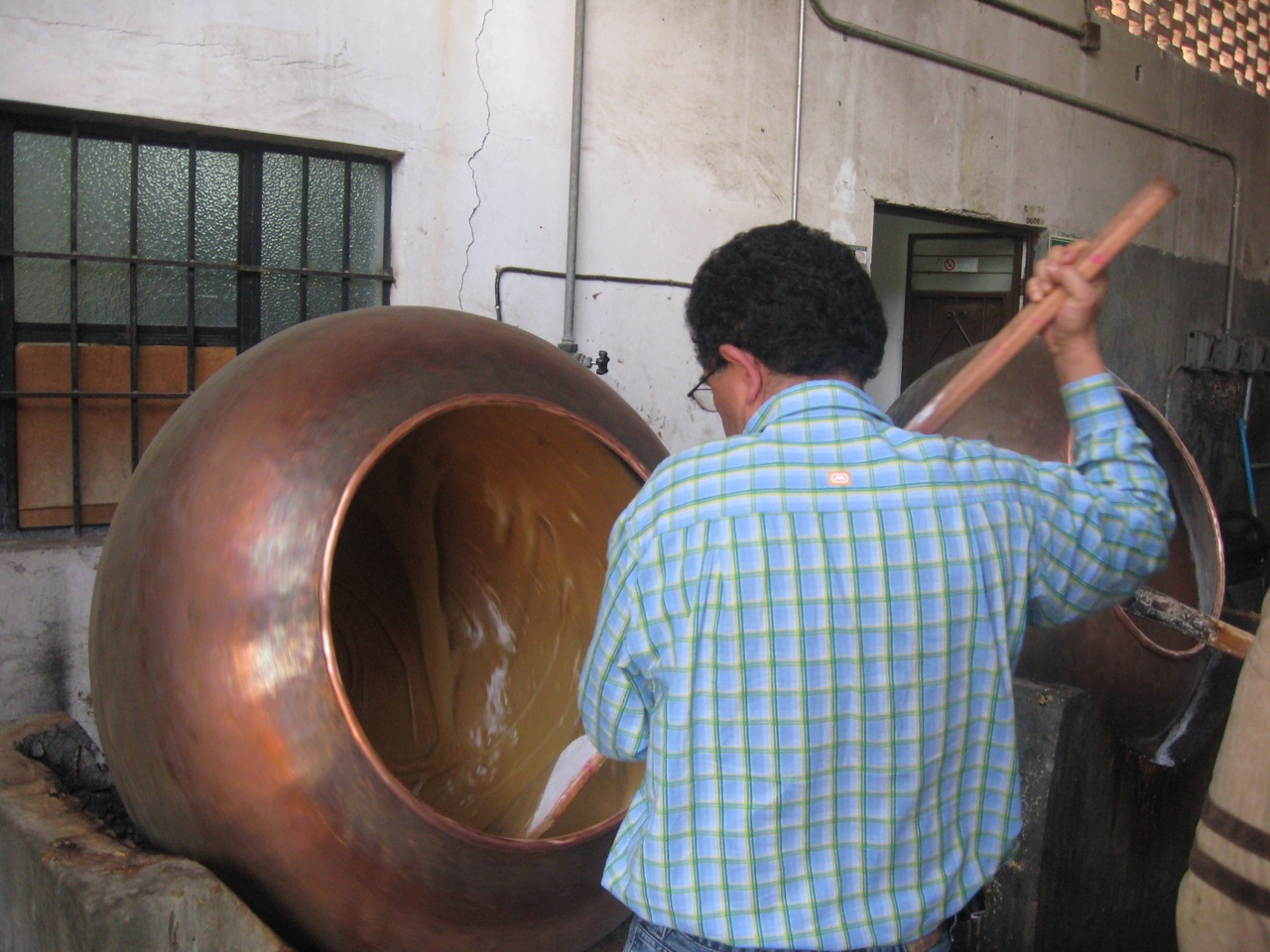
Making dulce de leche in a rotating copper vessel, in Mexico

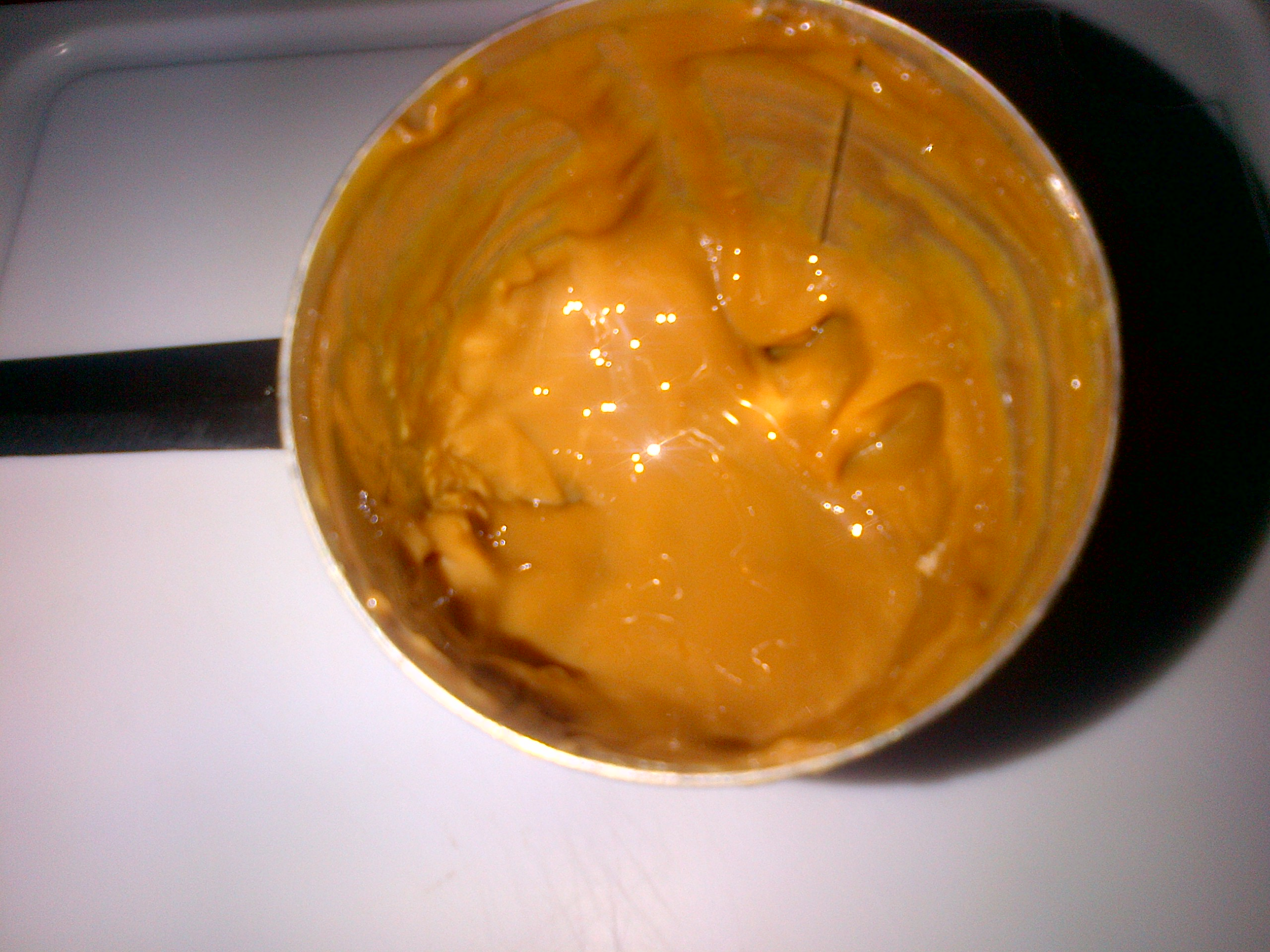
Consistency of dulce de leche made from boiling condensed milk in a can

Dulce de leche
Nutritional value per 100 g (3.5 oz)
- Energy: 1,320 kJ (320 kcal)
- Carbohydrates: 55.4 g
- Sugars lactose: 49.7 g 4.92 g
- Fat: 7.35 g
- Saturated: 4.53 g
- Monounsaturated: 2.14 g
- Protein: 6.84 g
Vitamins and minerals
Vitamins	Quantity %DV^{†}
Vitamin C	3% 2.6 mg
Minerals	Quantity %DV^{†}
Calcium	19% 251 mg
Sodium	6% 129 mg
- Other constituents: Quantity
- Water: 28.7 g
- Cholesterol: 29 mg
- Source: Estimates of USDA Food Nutrient Database
- ^{†}Percentages estimated using US recommendations for adults.

The most basic recipe calls for slowly simmering milk and sugar, stirring almost constantly until the sugar dissolves (baking soda then can be added), after more constant stirring (between 1.5 – 2 hours) until the mixture thickens and finally turns a rich brown golden-brown colour.

Other ingredients such as vanilla may be added for flavor. Much of the water in the milk evaporates and the mix thickens; the resulting dulce de leche is usually about a sixth of the volume of the milk used. The transformation that occurs in preparation is caused by a combination of two common non-enzymatic browning reactions called caramelization and the Maillard reaction.

Another method of preparation, similar to Russian boiled condensed milk known as "varyonoye sgushchyonoye moloko", "varyonaya sgushchyonka" (Ukrainian "varene zgushchene moloko"), involves using canned or boxed sweetened condensed milk and cooking it in a pressure cooker for 20 to 25 minutes for a light color and slightly soft consistency, or 40 to 45 minutes for a darker color and firmer consistency. If using condensed milk from a box, it should be wrapped in about 5 to 6 layers of aluminum foil to prevent it from bursting.

It is also possible to place the condensed milk in a glass jar and boil it in the pressure cooker. In this method, different ingredients can also be added to the sweetened condensed milk, such as shredded coconut or peanuts. However, certain precautions need to be taken, such as wrapping the jar with a kitchen towel and lining the pressure cooker with another kitchen towel so that the bottom of the jar does not touch the cooker (as contact may cause the glass to shatter). The cooking time is similar to the previous method (around 35 to 40 minutes). Water should be added to the pressure cooker – enough to cover the cans, boxes, or jars of condensed milk. A small amount of vinegar can be added to the water in the pressure cooker to prevent it from becoming discolored at the bottom. In all cases, once ready, it is important to let the dulce de leche cool completely, which takes about 2 hours.

== Use ==
Dulce de leche can be eaten alone, but is more commonly used as a topping or filling for other sweet foods, such as cakes (see Maria Luisa cake), churros, cookies (see alfajor), waffles, flan cakes (aka crème caramel (known as pudim among Portuguese-speakers, and not to be confused with British pie-like variant of flan), fruits like bananas and candied figs, and ice creams; it is also a popular spread on crepes (panqueques), obleas (wafers), and toast.

== Gallery ==
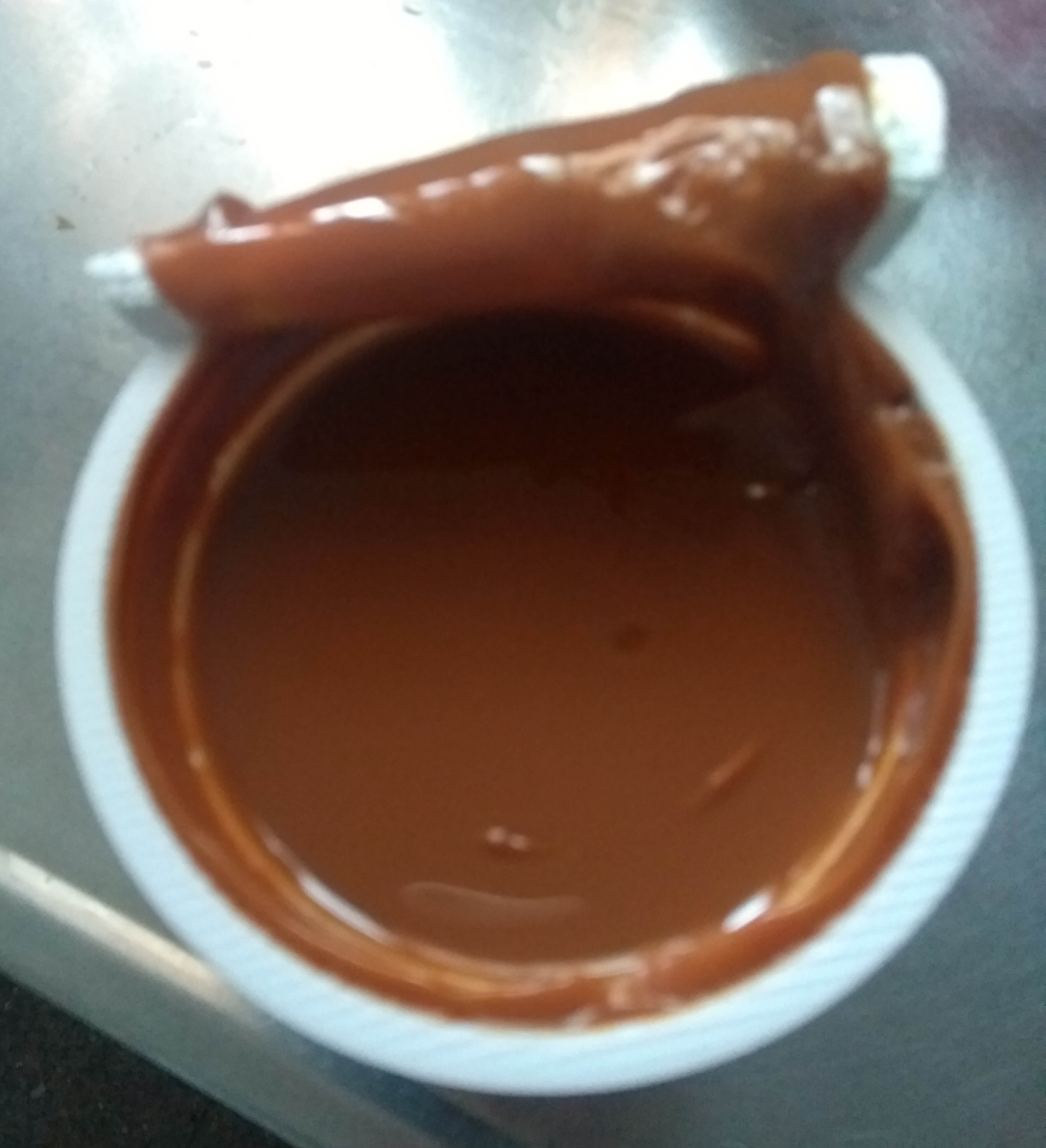
Dulce de leche pot

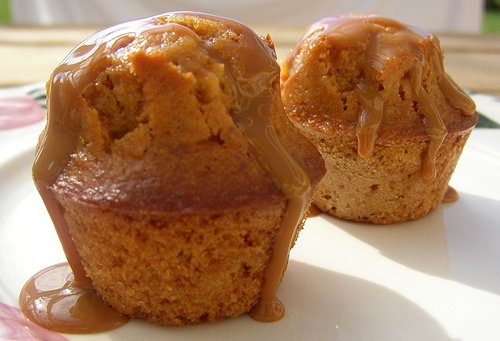
Muffins

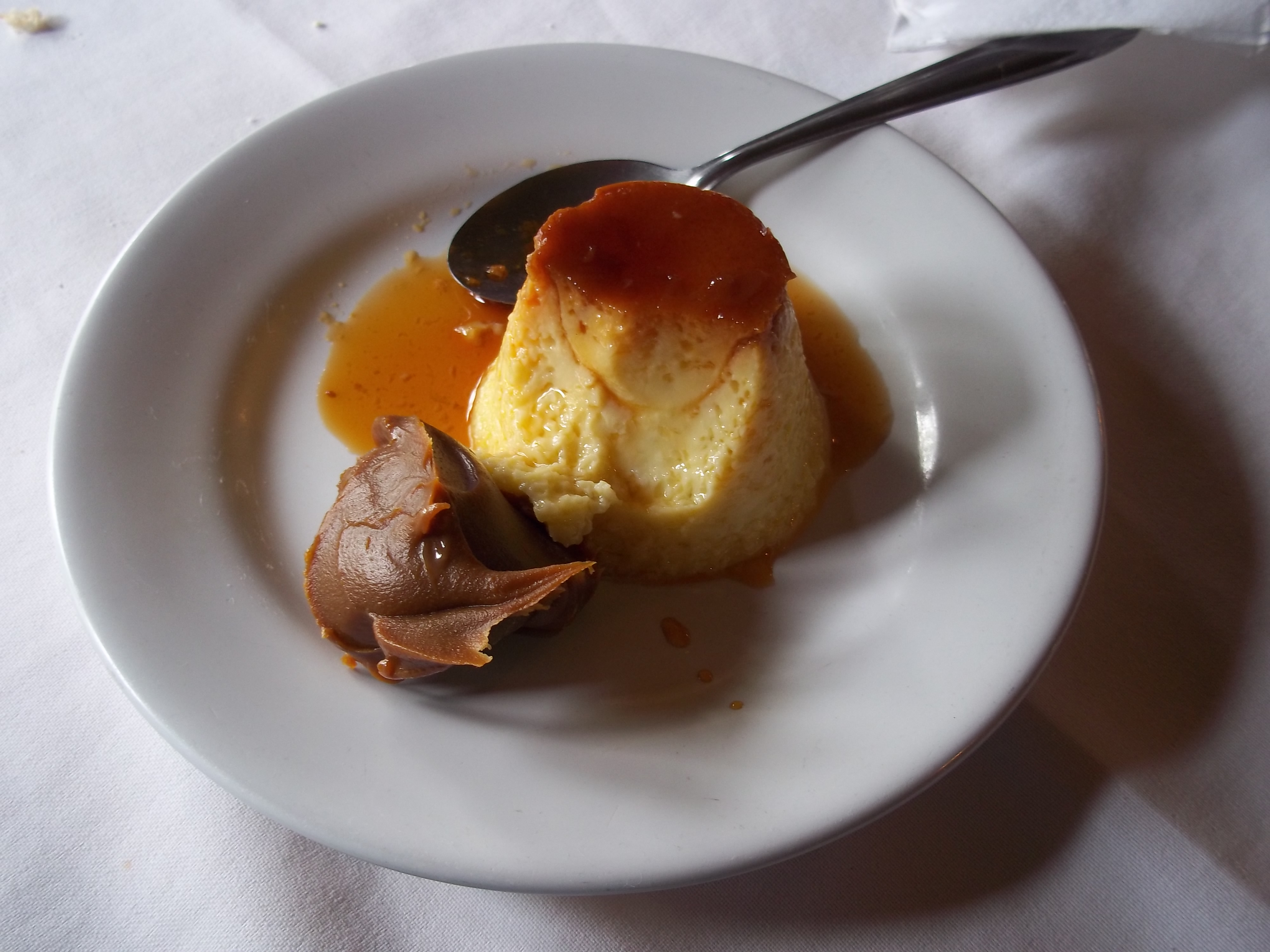
Crème caramel, a variant of a flan cake

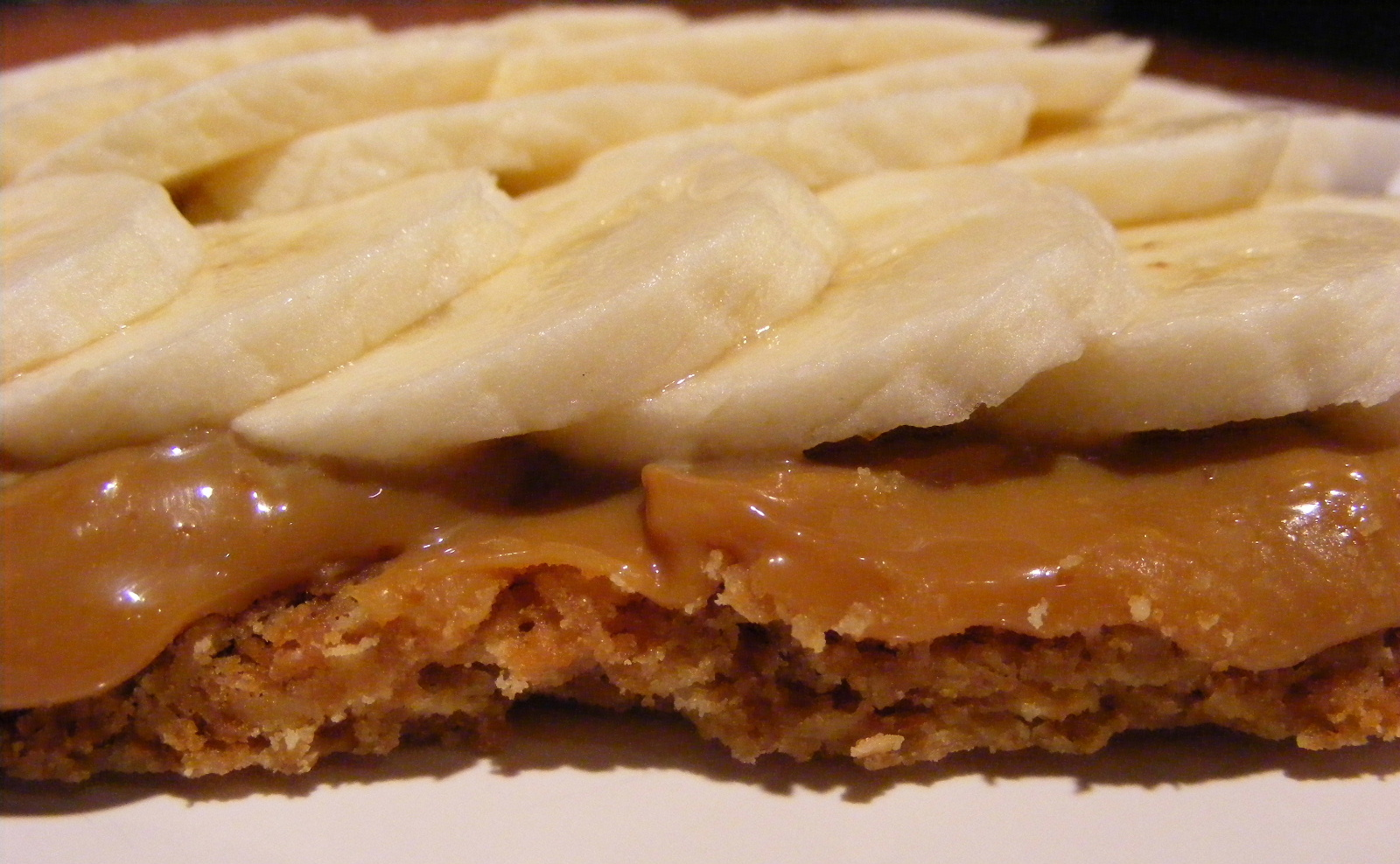
Banoffee pie

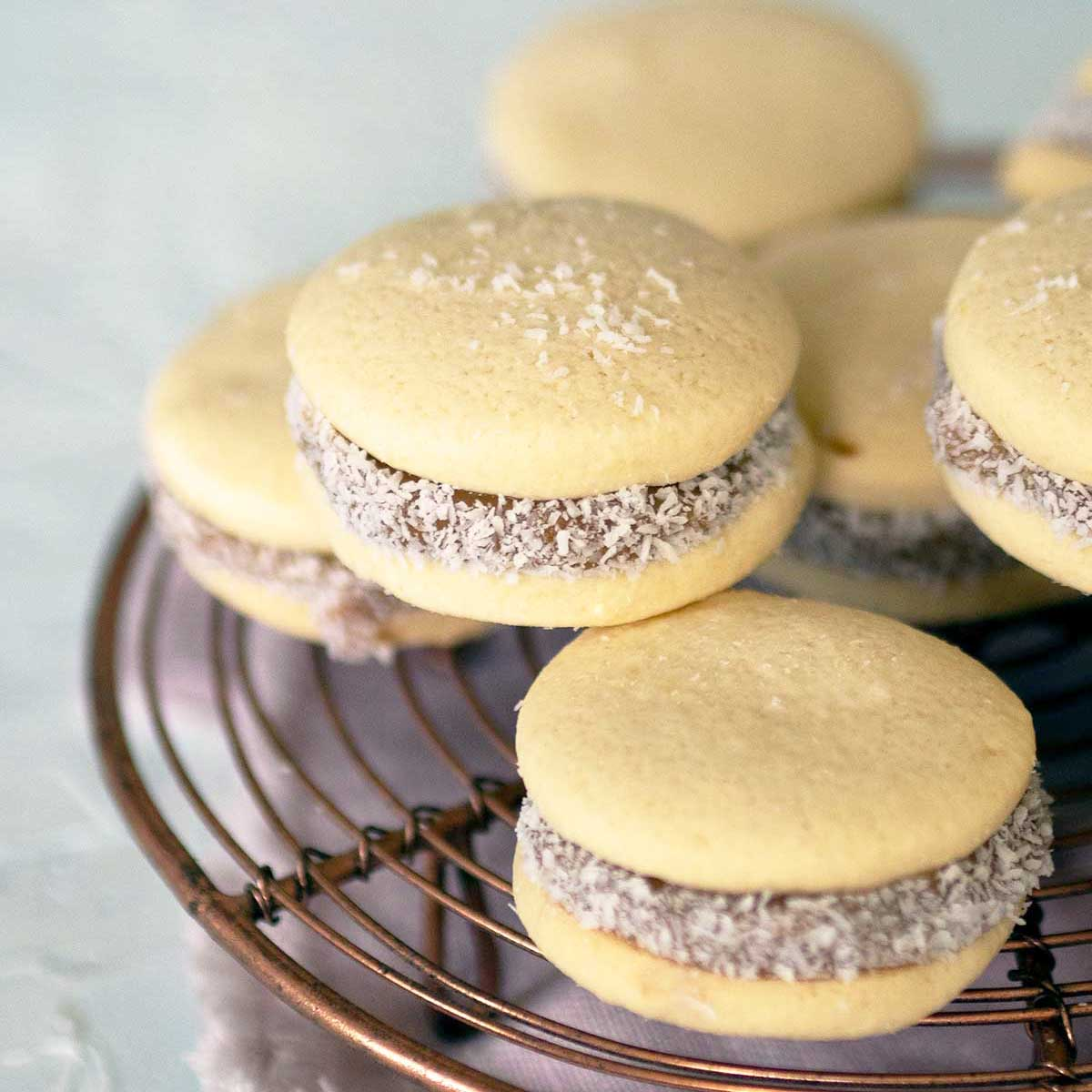
Corn starch alfajor

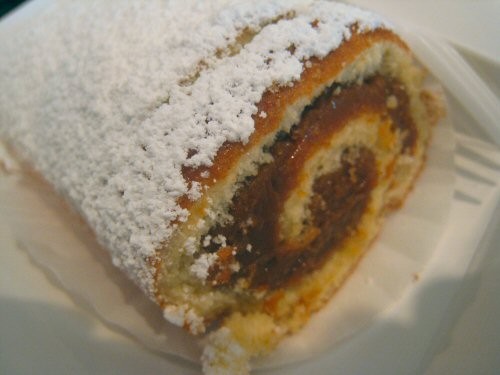
Dulce de leche roll

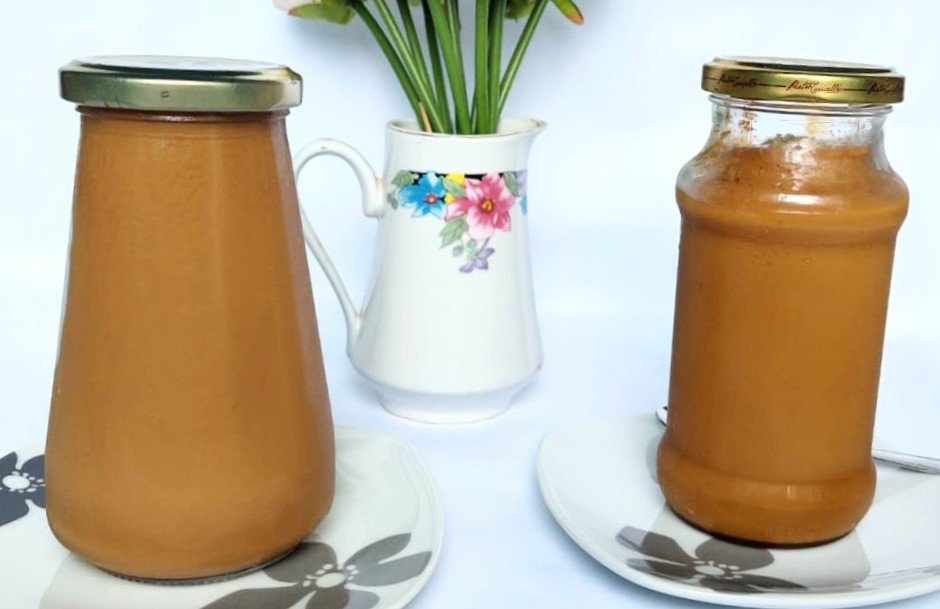
Dulce de leche in glass jars

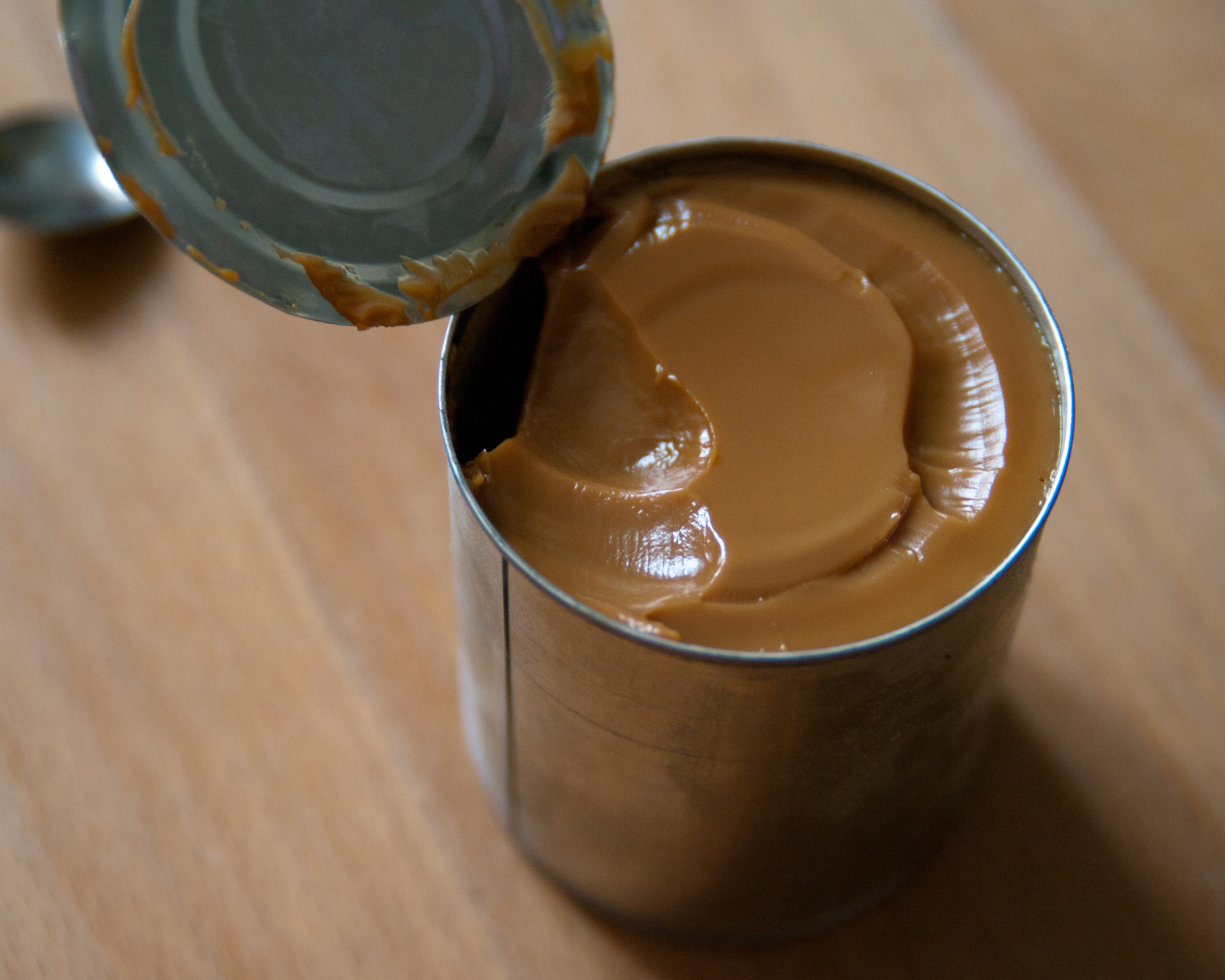
A can of condensed milk boiled for several hours to become varyonka, a dish similar to caramelized milk

== See also ==
- Baked milk – beverage derived from milk
- Banoffee pie – English dessert pie
- Basundi – Indian sweet
- Brunost – Norwegian cheese
- Caramel – confectionery product made by heating sugars
- Caramel candy – confectionery product made by heating sugars
- Crème caramel – custard dessert with soft caramel on top
- Condensed milk – milk from which water has been removed and sugar added
- Custard – semi-solid cooked mixture of milk and egg
- Krówki – Polish confectionery
- Manjar blanco – term used in Spanish-speaking area of the world in reference to milk-based delicacies
- Penuche – candy
- Russian candy – sweet toffee-like dessert
- Ryazhenka – fermented dairy beverage
- Sandesh – Bengali confectionery
- Teja
- Tres leches cake – dessert
