= Cajeta de Celaya =

Confection of thickened syrup

Cajeta
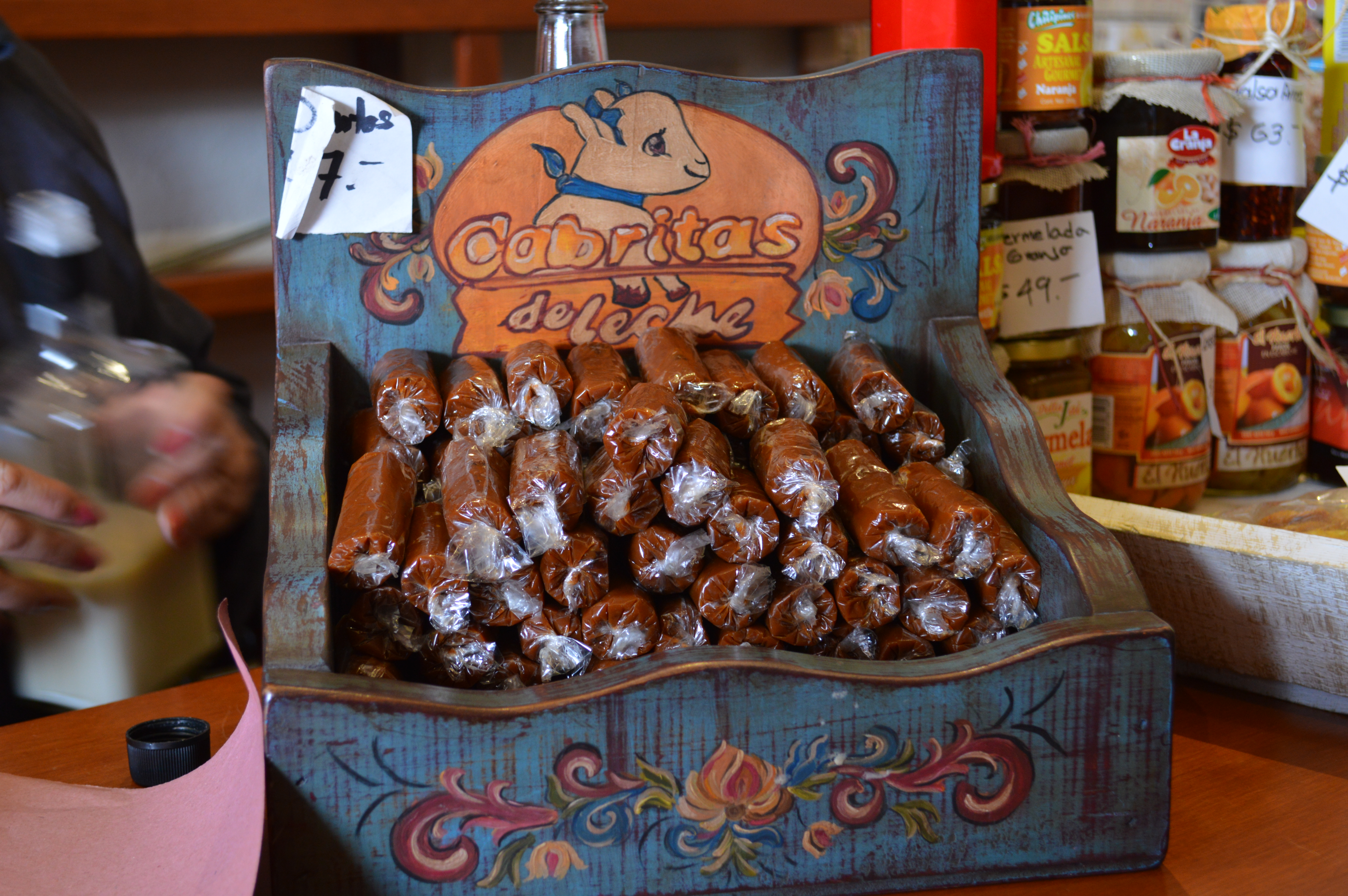
- Cajeta candy for sale in Toluca
- Course: dessert
- Place of origin: Mexico
- Main ingredients: goat's milk

Cajeta de Celaya is a confection of thickened caramel usually made of sweetened caramelised goat's milk. It is a type of dulce de leche. In Mexico, it is considered a specialty of the city of Celaya in the state of Guanajuato.

Cajeta is made by simmering goat's milk, or occasionally a sweetened liquid, stirring frequently, until its viscosity increases due to evaporation of water, and it becomes caramelized. While goat milk is the most usual base, other liquids or juices may be used.

In Celaya, and eventually the rest of Mexico, the confection of half goat's milk and half cow's milk became known by the name cajeta. Elsewhere, the milk candy is known as leche quemada or dulce de leche. Cajeta is eaten on its own as a sweet; as a spread or filling for breads and pastries, such as churros; and as a topping for ice cream.

Certain liquors are added to special recipes called cajeta envinada. In addition, cajeta envinada especial is enriched with raisins, almonds, pecans or nuts. Often it is used as a topping for crêpes, as a sweet sauce boiled and softened down with milk to soak the crepes, resulting in a dessert. It is also common to place cajeta between obleas to make a traditional Mexican candy.

== Recent events ==
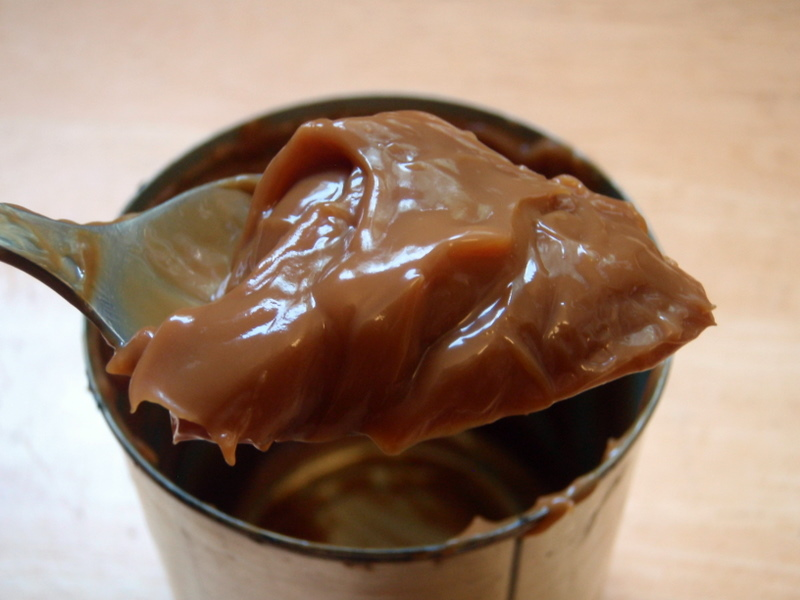
Typical leche quemada or dulce de leche.

In September, 2010, cajeta was declared the Bicentennial Dessert of Mexico, honouring its history, tradition and origin. Cajeta was born in the city of Celaya, Guanajuato, the state where the Independence of Mexico started back in 1810, with the famous Grito de Dolores by father Miguel Hidalgo. In Celaya, Hidalgo was named Captain General of America by his staff, making it an important element of the Independence War. Cajeta was easily stored and transported, and lasted for several months without decomposing, thus becoming an important food complement for the poorly fed troops (Martínez, 1976).

In 2005, the Hershey Company introduced a line of cajeta-flavored confections styled "Cajeta Elegancita", targeted at Mexican-food aficionados living in the United States. The marketing decision made headlines when it was discovered the word is a risqué term for the vulva in Argentinian and Uruguayan parlance. That same year, Nestlé released a "cajeta"-flavored Nesquik in Mexico.

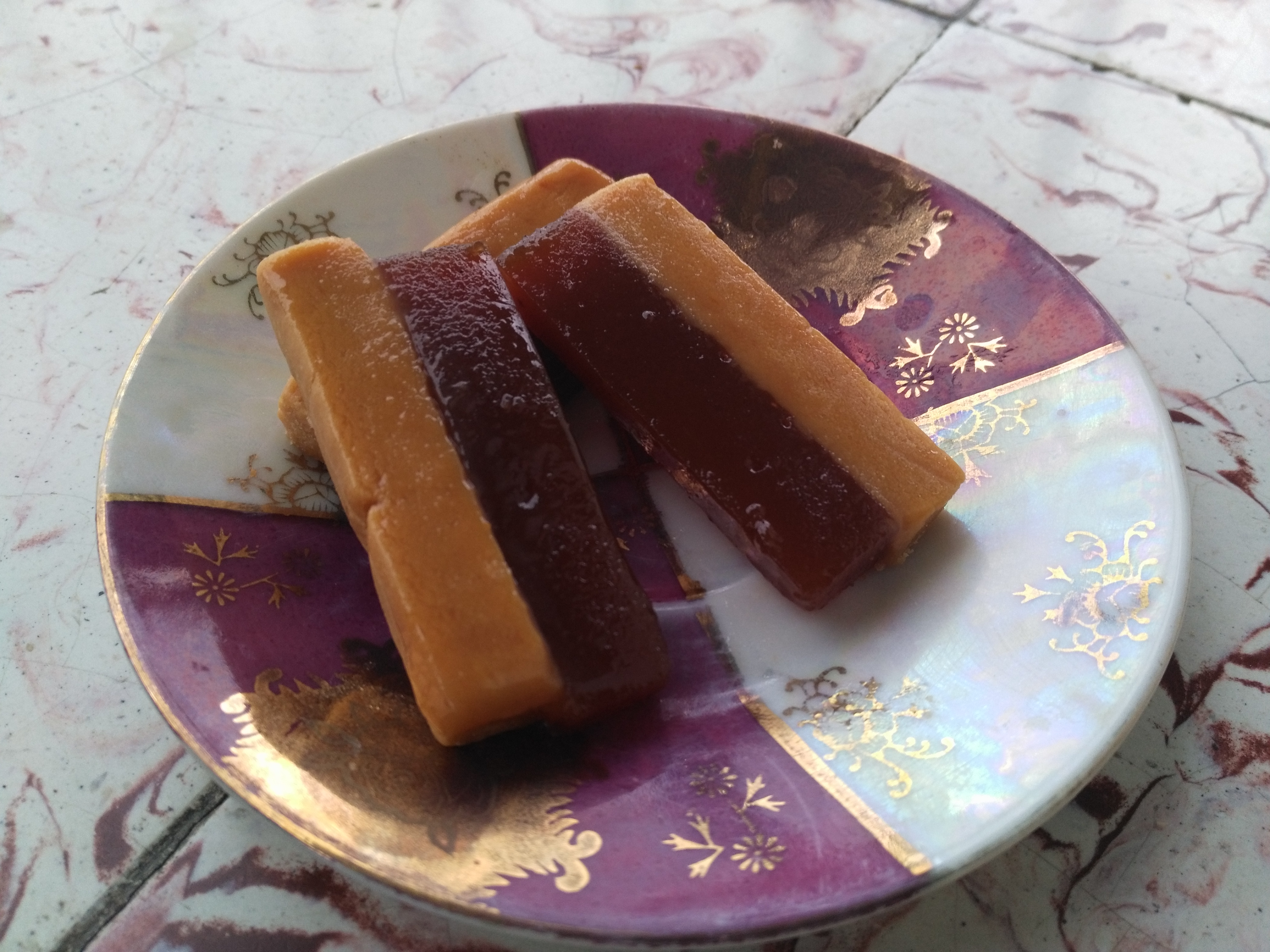
Central American cajeta, also known as "ate"

== See also ==
- Penuche
- List of Mexican dishes
- Caramel
