= Flying saucer (confectionery) =

Type of confection

Flying saucers
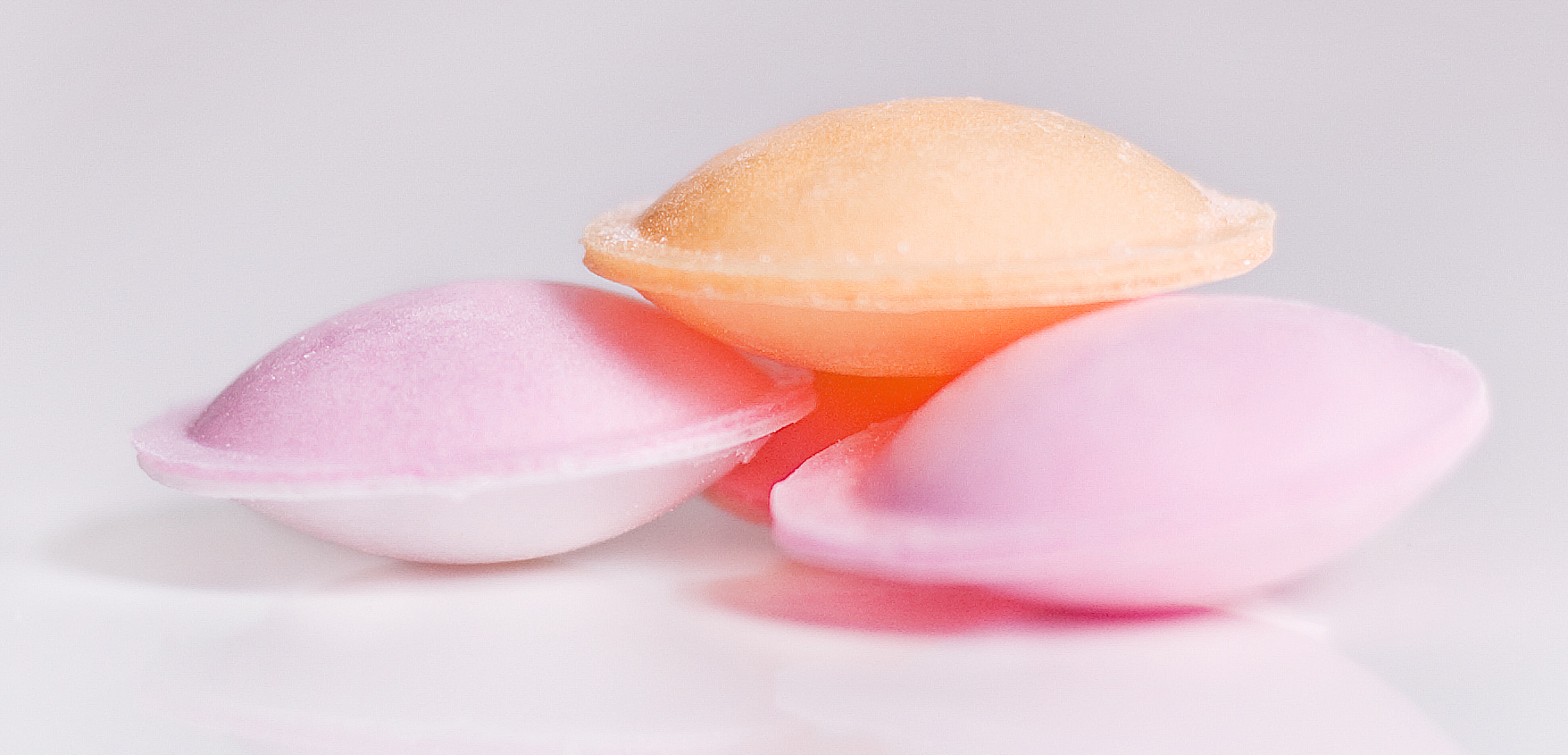
- Alternative names: UFOs
- Place of origin: Belgium, UK
- Main ingredients: Sherbet and wafer paper

Flying saucers (Flemish: Zure ouwels) or UFOs are small, lenticular wafer paper capsules filled with sherbet.

== History ==
The first flying saucers were produced in the early 1950s when an Antwerp-based producer of communion wafers, Belgica, faced a decline in demand for their product, due to the church deciding that wafers had to be made on consecrated ground, so they needed a new way of using the existing wafer-manufacturing process and ingredients. Astra Sweets, which purchased the Belgica brand, continues to manufacture flying saucers in the present day.

Flying saucers are officially registered as a traditional product of Flanders. They are also well known in the United Kingdom; their popularity in the country from the 1960s to the 1970s was attributed to the Space Race and an increased interest in science fiction.

They remain a popular sweet in Belgium and the United Kingdom. Flying saucers came 12th in a 2009 poll among adults for 'Britain's top sweets' and experienced a resurgence in popularity, along with other traditional sweets, in the 2010s. They have also been featured on lists of vegan sweets for Halloween. They were also a popular sweet in Ireland.

== See also ==
- Oblea – Wafer dessert
- Aparon – Filipino dessert made from unconsecrated communion wafers
- Christmas wafer
