= Celaya =

City and municipality in Mexico

- City and municipality
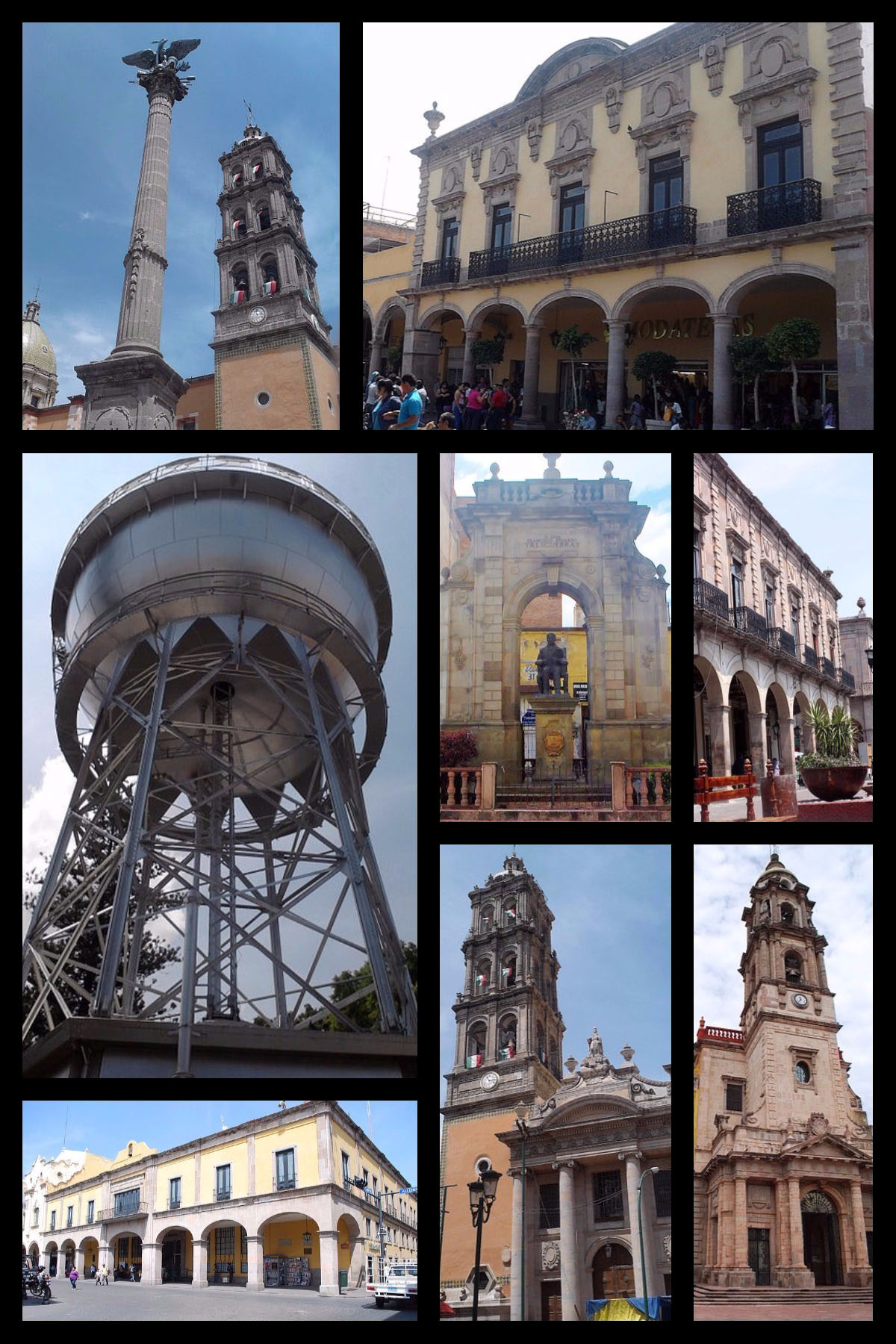
- In order from left to right: Ángel de la Independencia, Andador Guadalupe, Bola de agua, Estatua a Tresguerras, Portal Colunga, Catedral de San Francisco, Iglesia de la Virgen del Carmen and Palacio Municipal.

- Coat of arms
- Nickname: The Golden Gate of the Bajío
- Motto: "De Forti Dulcedo" (La Dulzura del Fuerte)
- Location within Guanajuato Location within Mexico
- Coordinates: 20°31′23″N 100°48′50″W
- Country: Mexico
- State: Guanajuato
- Foundation: October 12, 1570
- Founded as: Villa de la Purisíma Concepción de Zalaya
- Founder: Martín Enríquez de Almanza

Government
  - Mayor: Juan Miguel Ramirez Sanchez

Area
  - City: 65.3 km^{2} (25.2 sq mi)
  - Municipality: 553.1 km^{2} (213.6 sq mi)
- Elevation: 1,767 m (5,797 ft)

Population (2020 census)
  - City: 340,387
  - Density: 5,210/km^{2} (13,500/sq mi)
  - Metro: 717,616
  - Municipality: 521,169
  - Municipality density: 942.3/km^{2} (2,440/sq mi)

GDP (PPP, constant 2015 values)
  - Year: 2023
  - Total (Metro area): $15 billion
  - Per capita: $21,200
- Time zone: UTC-6 (Central Standard Time)
- Postal code: 38000 - 38159
- Area code: 461
- Airport: Aeropuerto Nacional Capitán Rogelio Castillo
- Website: http://www.celaya.gob.mx

Celaya (Spanish pronunciation: [seˈlaja]; Otomi: Ndathi) is a city and its surrounding municipality in the state of Guanajuato, Mexico, located in the southeast quadrant of the state. It is the third most populous city in the state, with a 2005 census population of 310,413. The municipality for which the city serves as municipal seat, had a population of 415,869. The city is located in the geographic center of the municipality, which has an areal extent of 553.1 km^{2} (213.6 sq mi) and includes many smaller outlying communities, the largest of which are San Miguel Octopan, Rincón de Tamayo and San Juan de la Vega.

There are many smaller towns around Celaya including Rincón de Tamayo, Tarimoro, Villagrán, La Moncada, Panales Jamaica (Cañones), Panales Galera, La Calera, La Estancia, La Noria, Los Fierros, El Acebuche, Cacalote, and Charco Largo. It is also not far away from Cortazar, Salamanca, Salvatierra, Apaseo el Grande, Querétaro City and among others. The city was founded in 1570 as Villa de la Purisíma Concepción de Zalaya. The word Zalaya is of Basque origin and means "Flat Land".

== History ==
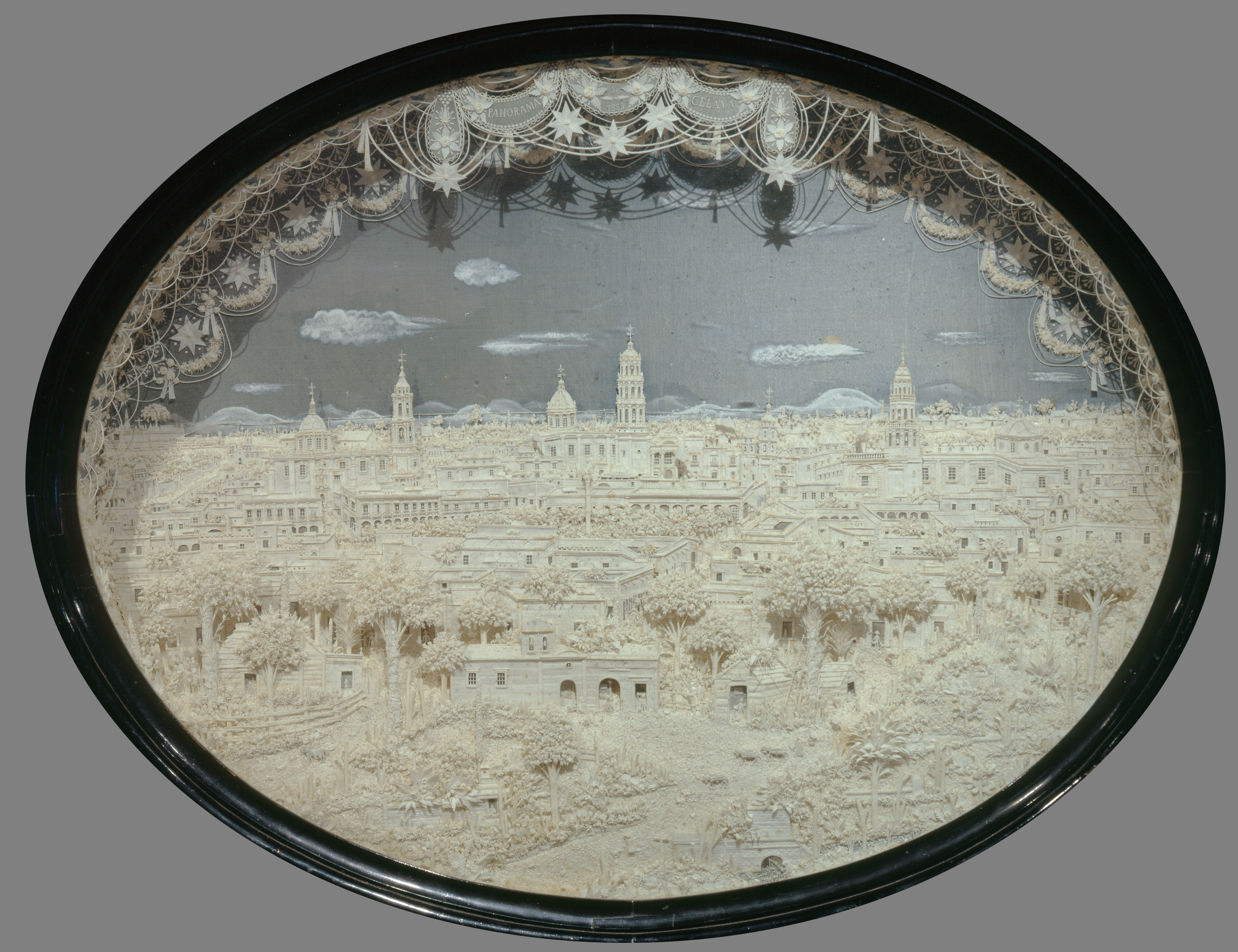
Panorama de la ciudad de Celaya, Guanajuato (Celaya city panorama), Anonymous, 1883, Museo Soumaya

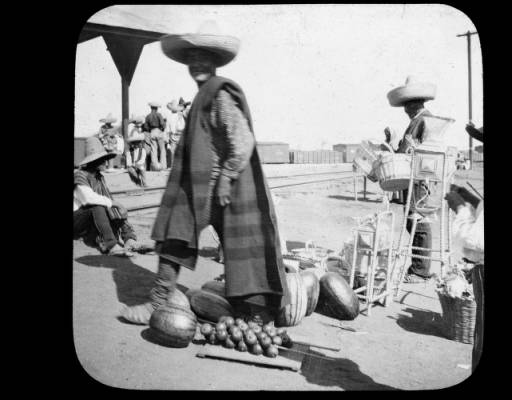
Street vendors in the Celaya train station before 1901

Celaya was a frontier region between the Purépecha and the Chichimecas.

General Álvaro Obregón defeated Pancho Villa in the Battle of Celaya in 1915, as referred by Martínez Celaya was also the Guanajuato state capital for a short period.

An explosion in a gunpowder and fireworks warehouse in September, 1999, killed over 60 people and injured over 300 people.

On 23 May 2022, eleven people were murdered in a massacre linked to the Mexican drug war.

== Geography ==
=== Climate ===
Celaya has a semi-arid climate (Köppen climate classification BSh).

Climate data for Celaya (1991-2020)
Month	Jan	Feb	Mar	Apr	May	Jun	Jul	Aug	Sep	Oct	Nov	Dec	Year
Record high °C (°F)	36.0 (96.8)	34.5 (94.1)	39.0 (102.2)	39.0 (102.2)	38.5 (101.3)	38.0 (100.4)	34.5 (94.1)	34.5 (94.1)	33.0 (91.4)	34.0 (93.2)	35.0 (95.0)	34.0 (93.2)	39.0 (102.2)
Mean daily maximum °C (°F)	26.1 (79.0)	27.8 (82.0)	29.8 (85.6)	31.4 (88.5)	31.7 (89.1)	29.6 (85.3)	27.6 (81.7)	27.9 (82.2)	27.6 (81.7)	27.8 (82.0)	27.4 (81.3)	26.5 (79.7)	28.4 (83.1)
Daily mean °C (°F)	16.3 (61.3)	17.8 (64.0)	19.9 (67.8)	22.1 (71.8)	23.3 (73.9)	22.6 (72.7)	21.2 (70.2)	21.3 (70.3)	21.1 (70.0)	20.1 (68.2)	18.5 (65.3)	17.0 (62.6)	20.1 (68.2)
Mean daily minimum °C (°F)	6.5 (43.7)	7.9 (46.2)	10.0 (50.0)	12.8 (55.0)	14.8 (58.6)	15.5 (59.9)	14.8 (58.6)	14.7 (58.5)	14.5 (58.1)	12.5 (54.5)	9.6 (49.3)	7.5 (45.5)	11.8 (53.2)
Record low °C (°F)	−3.5 (25.7)	−3.5 (25.7)	−3.0 (26.6)	1.0 (33.8)	6.0 (42.8)	7.0 (44.6)	8.0 (46.4)	6.5 (43.7)	3.0 (37.4)	3.5 (38.3)	−1.5 (29.3)	−3.5 (25.7)	−3.5 (25.7)
Average precipitation mm (inches)	11.1 (0.44)	11.9 (0.47)	10.7 (0.42)	8.0 (0.31)	27.4 (1.08)	101.7 (4.00)	146.2 (5.76)	137.1 (5.40)	116.9 (4.60)	34.4 (1.35)	10.4 (0.41)	4.1 (0.16)	619.9 (24.41)
Average precipitation days (≥ 0.1 mm)	2.6	2.1	2.5	3.1	8.0	12.7	16.4	14.0	12.3	6.3	3.2	1.7	84.9
Source: Servicio Meteorologico Nacional (extremes 1971-2020)

== Education ==
- Centro Pedagogico de Celaya
- Colegio Arturo Rosenblueth
- Colegio Marista
- Colegio Nuevo Continente Bajío Celaya Campus
- Complejo Educativo Ignacio Allende
- Colegio Mexico
- Escuela Bilingue Guilford
- Instituto Andersen
- Instituto Bilingue Oxford
- Instituto Británico de Celaya (BIC)
- Instituto Educativo Rosa G. de Carmona
- Instituto Sir Winston Churchill
- Instituto Tecnologico de Celaya
- Instituto Tecnologico de Roque
- Instituto Universitario del Centro de México (UCEM)
- Universidad de Celaya
- Universidad de Guanajuato
- Universidad de Itesba
- Universidad Lasallista Benavente
- Universidad Latina de Mexico
- Westminster Royal College

== Attractions ==
=== Ball of Water ===
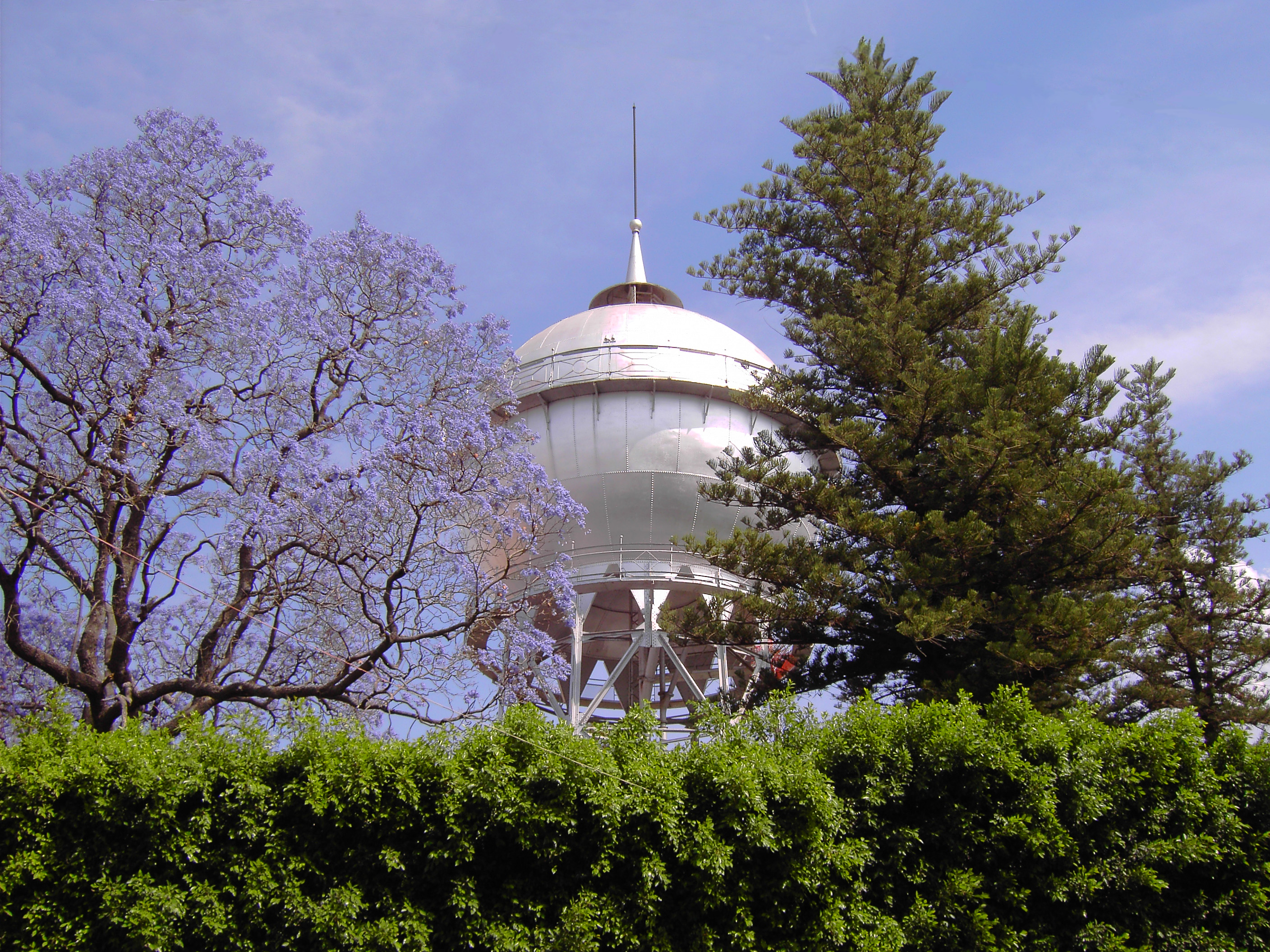
Celaya's main icon—a water tower in the heart of the city.

The Ball of Water reservoir has been a city icon since 1908; it continues to supply water to portions of downtown. The tank was manufactured in Germany and assembled on site, and is unique in being assembled using rivets rather than welds. It is believed to be the only one of its kind with a spherical shape (it is rumored that there was another similar water ball in Stuttgart, Germany that was destroyed during the Second World War). Traditionally, locals tell visitors that it is filled with cajeta, taking them to visit the "Bola del Agua" on Sundays, the traditional day for visiting the Independencia Lane. A plaque at the base of the water tower features the legend (in Spanish):

'"This tower was built at the expense of the city municipality in 1910 and officially opened on 15 September, the day of the anniversary of the proclamation of the independence of Mexico as a state governor Mr. Don Joaquín González Obregón, who gave full moral support to the construction.'s work and everything related to the provision of drinking water, was designed and conducted by the district political head Mr. Don Perfecto I. Aranda, its total cost, including piping limited to two circuits, was $ 161,520.84 (mexican old) pesos ".

The work was carried out under the command of German Enrique Schöndube, although it is known that payment for the construction took ten years due to the start of the Mexican Revolution, so it was paid once the new government established. During the Mexican Revolution, Villa's officers thought the hydraulic tower had such a large amount of water that destroying it would drown the population of Celaya. One of Villa's generals ordered his artillery to destroy it. Captain Gustavo Duron, in charge of a 75mm battery, followed the orders but shot around the tower, avoiding it and protecting the monument, as mentioned by local historian Herminio Martínez. The construction resulted in the neglect of the people handing out water at home from the mayor's office called water carriers. Commercial advertising on its surface was allowed for several years to cover the costs of the reservoir, ending on September 8, 1980, when, in celebration of upcoming 410th Anniversary of the Foundation of Celaya, the mayor in charge decreed that the Ball of Water would be a symbol that would represent the city, and the placement of advertisements was banned.

=== Cuisine ===
Celaya is also known for the artisanal production of cajeta, a type of milk candy.

== Transportation ==
The Celaya Airport had (as of January 22, 2007) commercial flights to Santiago de Querétaro and connections from there to other destinations; these services were dropped in 2008. Celaya lies along the El Paso Spur of the Pan-American Highway which is known locally as Mexican Federal Highway 45.

== Notable people ==
- Marta Sahagún de Fox (b. April 10, 1953), former Mexican First Lady and wife of President Vicente Fox, lived in Celaya and unsuccessfully ran for mayor
- Guillermo Martínez (b. 15 March 1995), Footballer
- Miguel Martínez (b. September 29, 1921), Musician, composer and songwriter. Considered the father of the modern mariachi trumpet
- Francisco Eduardo Tresguerras (b. October 13, 1759, d. August 3, 1833), Architect and painter. Designed the El Carmen church in Celaya
- Joshua Ilika Brenner (b. September 14, 1976) Olympic swimmer
- Liliana Ibáñez (b. January 30, 1991), Olympic swimmer
- Teresa Magueyal (1958–2023), Mexican human rights activist.
- Raúl Velasco (b. April 24, 1933, d. November 26, 2006) Entertainer and TV Producer. Was the host of the TV program Siempre en Domingo.
- Octavio Ocampo (b. February 28, 1943) Painter known for his "metamorphosis" style.
- Mauricio Ochmann (b. November 16, 1977), Actor
- Ever Guzmán (b. 15 March 1988), Footballer
- José Juan Vázquez (b. 14 March 1988), Footballer
- David Roberto Bárcena Ríos (26 December 1941 – 22 February 2017) was a Mexican equestrian who competed at five Olympic Games, winning a bronze medial in the Team Event at his fifth Olympics
- Eduardo Clark (1991), public official

== Sister cities ==
- Carrboro, North Carolina, United States
- Chapel Hill, North Carolina, United States
- Guernica, Spain
- Oaxaca, Mexico
- Tuxtla Gutiérrez, Mexico

== See also ==
- Club Celaya a football club from the 1950s that was resurrected in 2003
- Atlético Celaya a former association football team
- Auditorio Tresguerras
- Estadio Miguel Alemán
- Roman Catholic Diocese of Celaya
- Immaculate Conception Cathedral, Celaya

== Sources ==
- Link to tables of population data from Census of 2005 INEGI: Instituto Nacional de Estadística, Geografía e Informática
- Guanajuato Enciclopedia de los Municipios de México
