= Wafer paper =

Edible paper of rice or potato starch

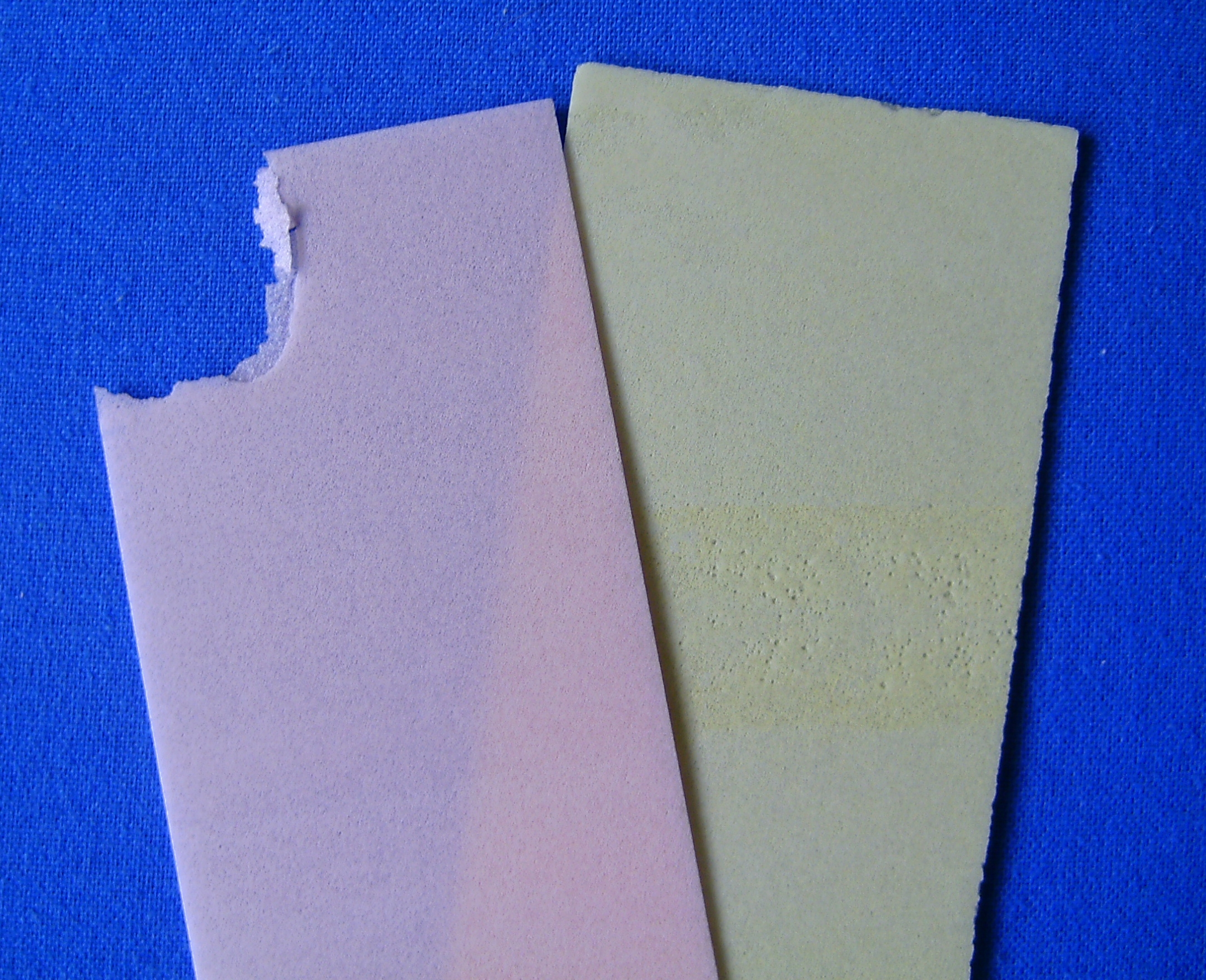
- Colored wafer paper
- Alternative names: Edible paper; Rice paper
- Type: Ingredient
- Place of origin: Western Europe
- Main ingredients: Starch (potato or rice)
- Variations: Oburāto
- Similar dishes: Bánh tráng; Kiping; Wafer

Wafer paper, also called edible paper or rice paper, is a very thin, edible sheet used in baking, confectionery and pharmaceuticals.

== History ==
Wafer paper evolved from the production of wafers. Called oblaten in Germany, it was used as an edible non-stick baking paper, particularly for lebkuchen.

== Production and usage ==
Wafer paper is made of thinly rolled and baked starch, such as potato or rice.

=== Confectionery usage ===
Wafer paper is used as an edible wrapper for sticky confectionery like nougat. Some candies are made largely out of wafer paper, such as flying saucers.

Wafer paper is also valued as an edible decoration: it can be made into flowers, edible fabric and other shapes, while being light.

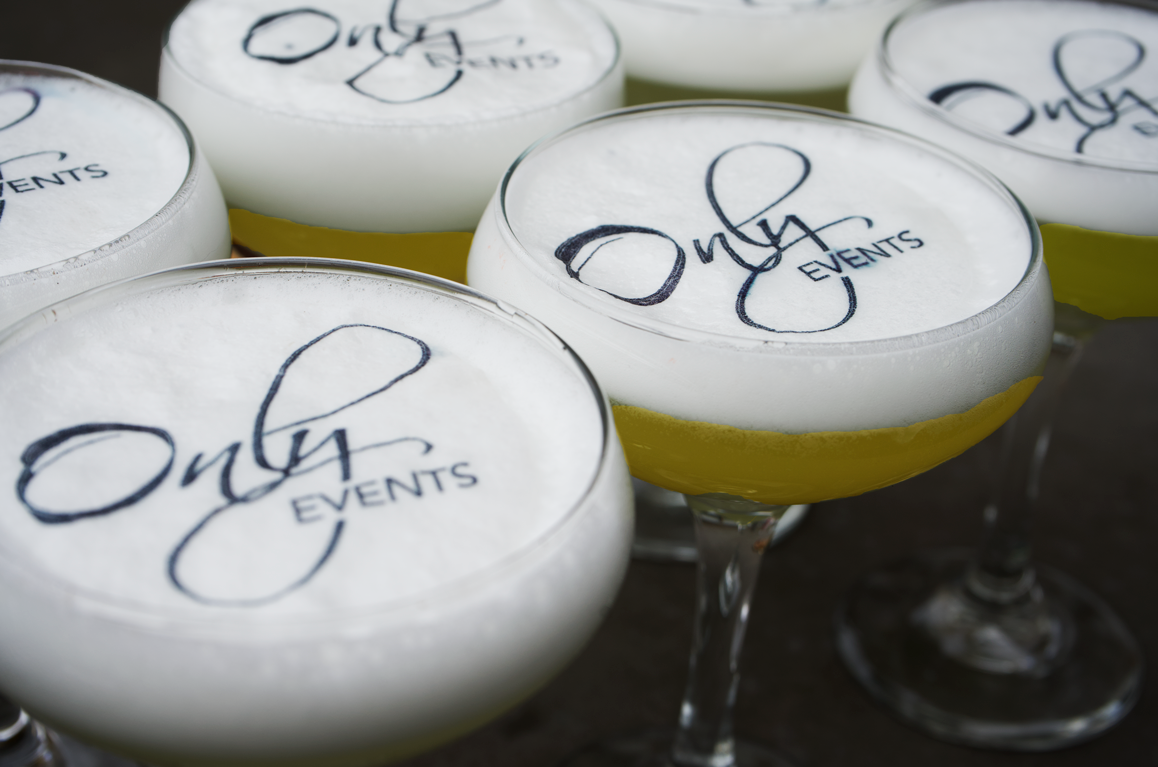
Edible ink printed on wafer paper, floated atop cocktail foam

==== Edible printing ====
Wafer paper is a favored material for edible printing.

=== Pharmaceutical usage ===
Wafer paper can be used as an aid in taking medicine, providing a barrier to tasting what is wrapped inside without inhibiting digestion. It can also used in taking recreational drugs, which is called a 'parachute'.

== Oburāto ==
Oburāto (オブラート, loanword from Dutch oblaat 'wafer paper') is a particularly thin and transparent wafer paper, made of rice starch. It was inspired by Dutch wafer paper, introduced to Japan in the Edo era.

Oburāto is used to wrap sticky candies like dagashi – particularly Botan Rice Candy and White Rabbit candy.

== See also ==
- Bánh tráng - a pliable Vietnamese edible wrapper made from rice flour
- Cake decorating
- Kiping - a paper-thin Filipino wafer made from glutinous rice starch
- Sugar sculpture
