= Maria Luisa cake =

Layer cake

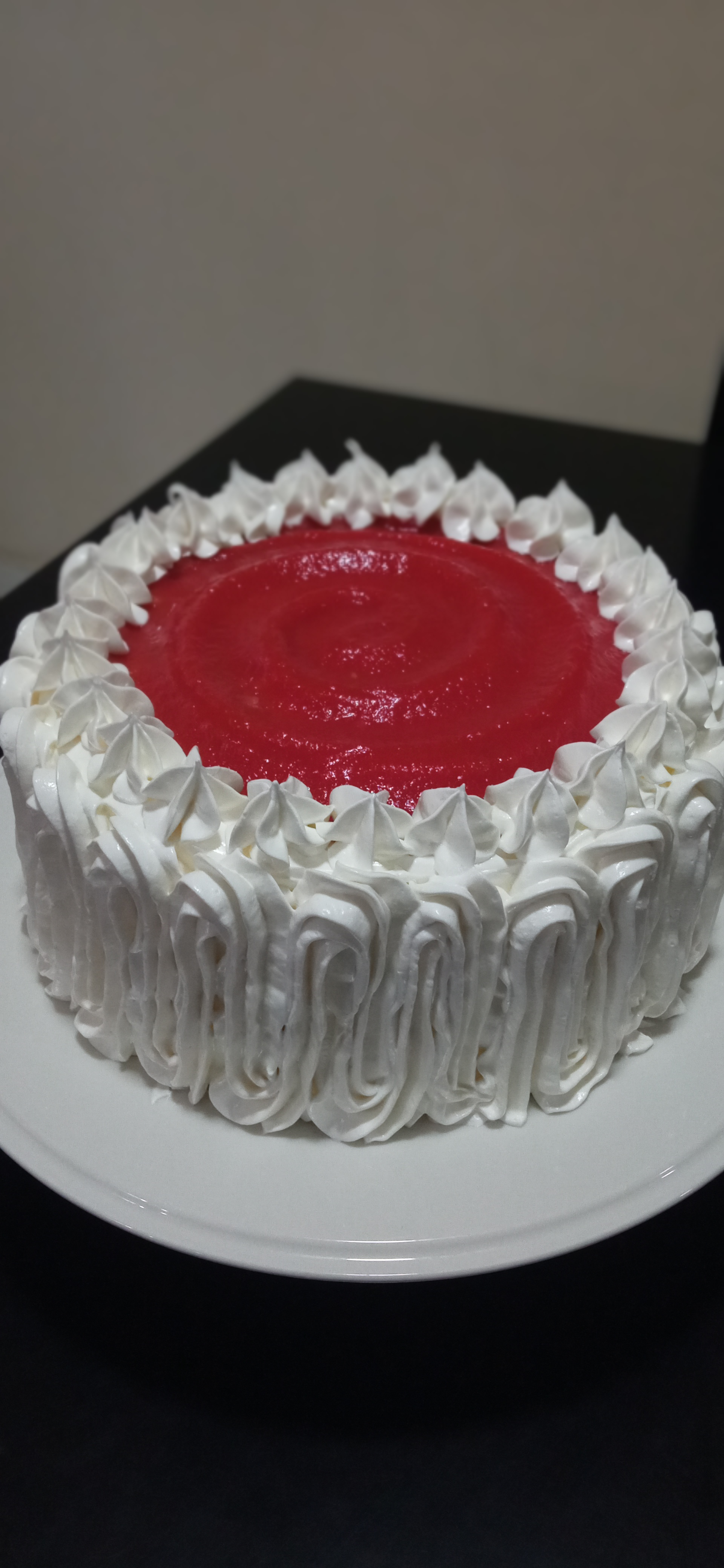
An unsliced torta María Luisa

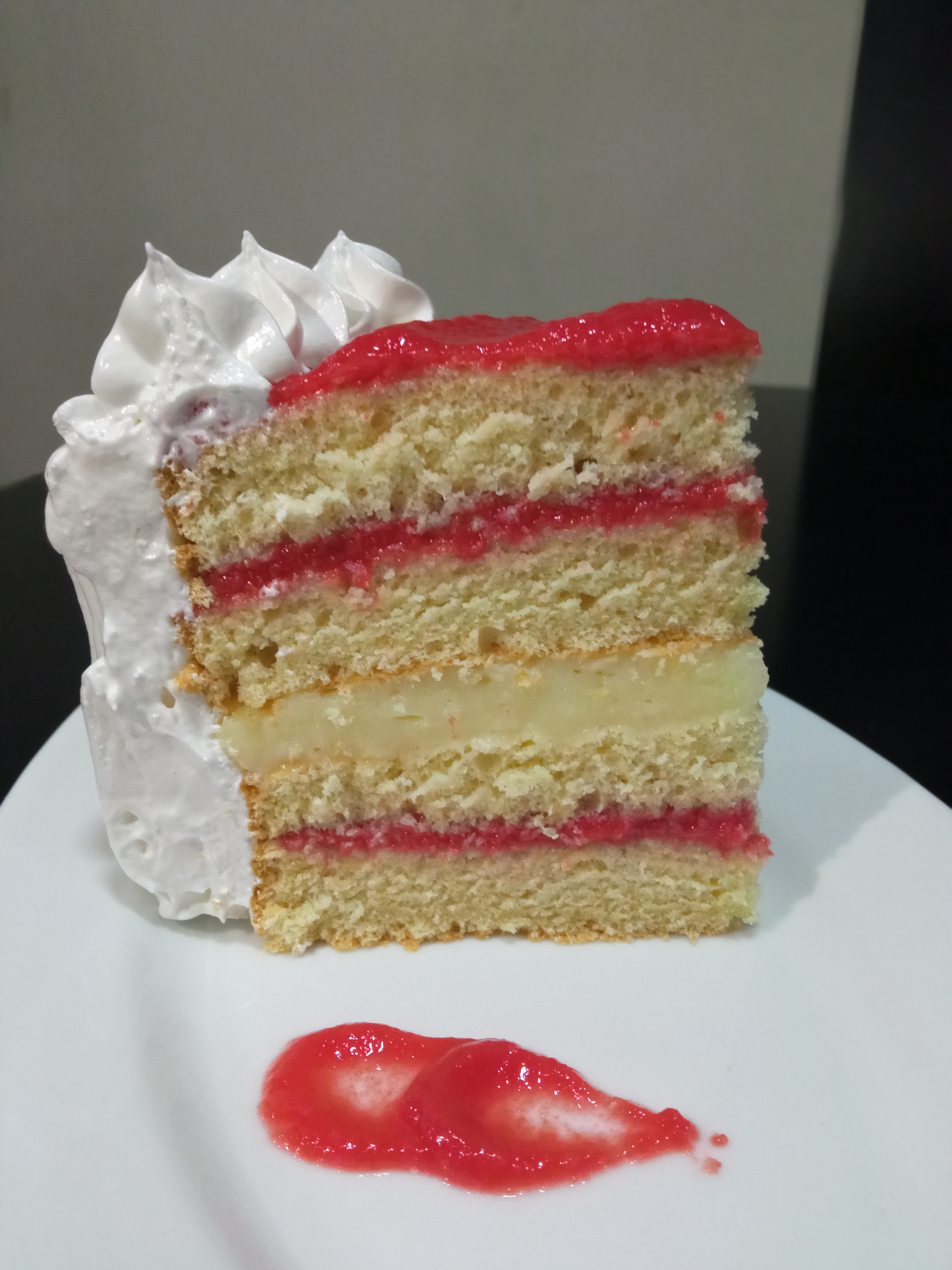
A sliced torta María Luisa

Maria Luisa cake (Spanish: torta María Luisa) is a dessert found in Latin American cuisine. It is a type of layer cake, similar to the English Victoria sponge cake, usually served with a sweet filling made of fruit preserves. It is particularly known in modern times as a product of Colombian and Salvadoran cuisine.

== History ==
Maria Luisa cake originated in Venezuelan cuisine. Rufino Blanco Fombona described Maria Luisa cake being served sprinkled with candies and blanketed in a delicious snowy frosting ("arenada de confites y nevada de nieve deliciosa"). Maria Luisa cake was a cultural development of the Mantuanos, the colonial-era aristocrats; first appearing in the mid-eighteenth century, it was originally served filled with guava syrup and cream. Other early references to the cake include alternative fillings that are no longer common, such as frangipane.

== Preparation ==
At its heart, Maria Luisa cake closely resembles a Victoria sponge. In Colombia, Maria Luisa cake may be filled with arequipe (dulce de leche). In El Salvador, Maria Luisa cake may be filled with poleada (a creamy milk custard). More typically, Maria Luisa cake is described as a "fresh-tasting layer cake flavored with orange juice, orange zest, and orange marmalade." There are many versions, although the cake is traditionally filled with berry preserves or jam.

The cake is often garnished with powdered sugar. In El Salvador, some bakers prepare Maria Luisa cake with a meringue layer, while others finish it with a sugar glaze. Maria Luisa cake is also often made with a "signature" topping of bright pink sugar. As with most cakes, when preparing Maria Luisa cake it is important to use room temperature ingredients, especially eggs, to help the batter emulsify correctly.
