= Christmas wafer =

European Catholic Christmas tradition

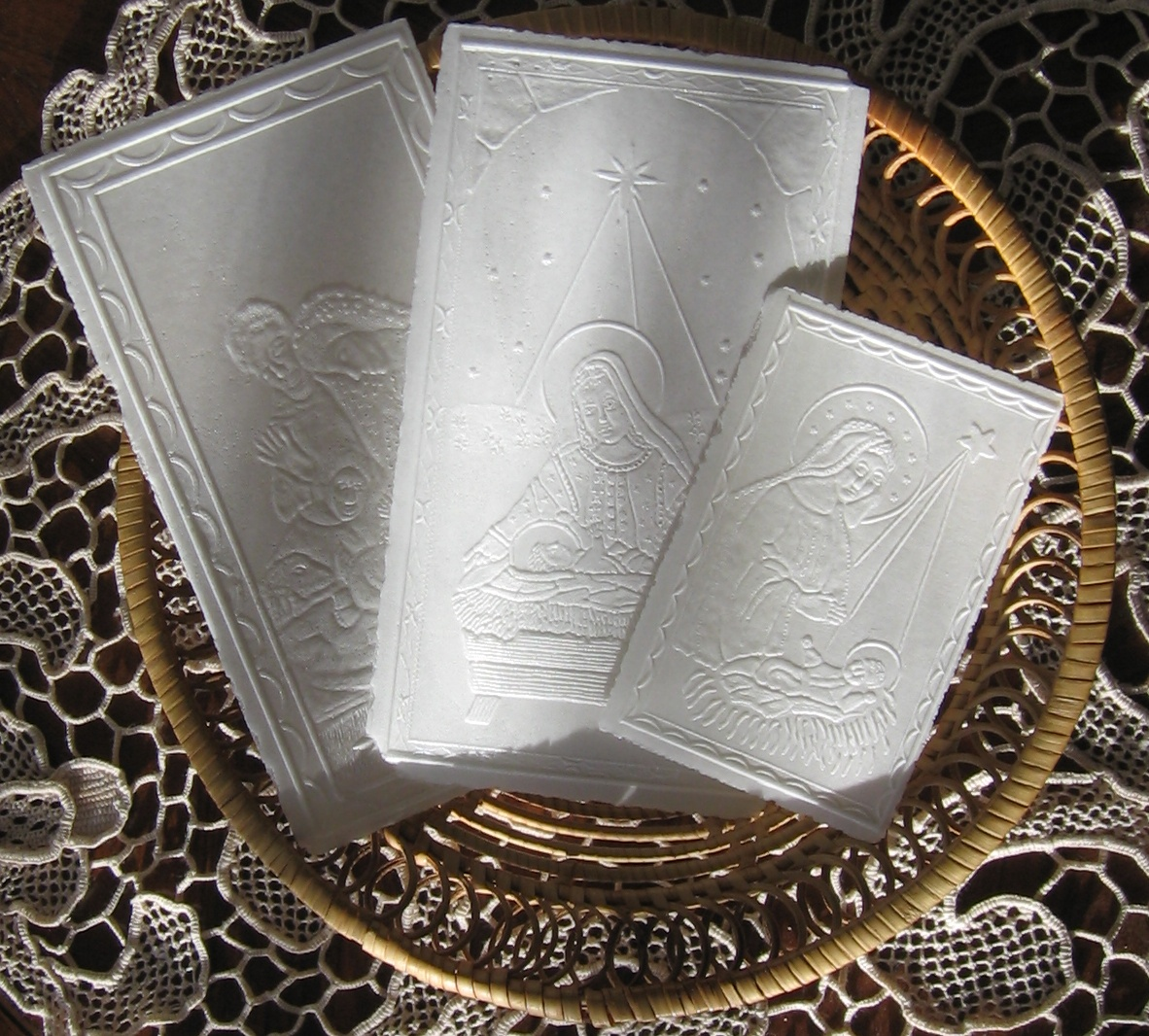
- Type: Flatbread
- Place of origin: Poland
- Region or state: Central Europe, Baltic States
- Main ingredients: Wheat flour, water

Christmas wafer (Polish: opłatek [ɔˈpwatɛk], plural opłatki; Lithuanian: kalėdaitis [kɐlʲeːˈdɐjtʲɪs], plural kalėdaičiai; Slovak: oblátka, plural oblátky) is a Catholic Christmas tradition celebrated in Poland, Lithuania, Moravia, and Slovakia. The custom is traditionally observed during Kūčios in Lithuania and Wigilia in Poland on December 24.

The unleavened wafers are baked from pure wheat flour and water, are usually rectangular in shape and very thin; they are identical in composition to the altar bread that becomes the Eucharist at the consecration during Mass in the Roman Catholic Church. The Opłatki wafers are embossed with Christmas-related religious images, varying from the nativity scene, especially Virgin Mary with baby Jesus, to the Star of Bethlehem.

== Observance and practice ==
Before partaking of the Christmas Eve meal, the family gathers around the table. The eldest member holds a large wafer and breaks off a piece to begin the ritual. The remaining wafer is passed on to another member while a prayer for loved ones is said. This continues until everyone at the table has a piece of the wafer. Finally, each family member gives wishes to every other family member, consuming a piece of wafer broken off of the wafer piece of the person to whom they were giving their wishes.

== History and cultural importance ==
The breaking of the Christmas wafer is a custom that began in Poland in the 10th century and is practiced by people of Polish ancestry around the world. It is considered the most ancient and beloved of Polish traditions.

In Poland and some parts of Central Europe, these Christmas wafers are dyed and used as ornaments. They are also sent as small trinkets with greeting cards to loved ones who are away from home.

The Christmas wafer symbolizes the unity of the family, which many consider to be the main pillar of society. According to beliefs, the bond of unity should exist between family members. The father is seen as the link in the unbroken chain of One Body, One Bread, One Christ, and One Church, while other family members join him in this eternal procession. The wafer also symbolizes forgiveness and reconciliation.

== Lithuania ==
Before the Kūčios meal starts, the families in Lithuania share kalėdaitis, also known as plotkelė, paplotėlis, plokštainėlis or Dievo pyragai depending on the region of Lithuania a family is from. A plate with as many wafers as there are persons participating in the meal is placed in the center of the table. Each member of the family is given a piece of unleavened wafer.

The head of the family, typically the oldest person present however often father of the family, then takes a wafer and offers it to a family member wishing them a Happy Christmas. "God grant that we are all together again next year", they respond and break off a piece of wafer. The family member then offers the head of the family a piece of their wafer in return. The head of the family then offers their wafer to every family member or guest at the table.

After them, all the diners exchange greetings and morsels of wafer.

== Origins ==
The tradition traces its origins to the times of early Christianity (see Antidoron) and is seen as a non-sacramental foreshadowing of the liturgical partaking of the Holy Eucharist (Host), unleavened bread consecrated into the Body, Blood, Soul and Divinity of Jesus Christ. As a Christmas custom the "opłatek" originated in Poland and was spread widely as far back as the 17th century. It was part of the szlachta's (Polish nobility) culture and the custom had spread throughout the Polish–Lithuanian Commonwealth and neighbouring countries. In the 19th century, in the aftermath of the partitions of Poland, it gained patriotic subtext, as the common wish during sharing of "opłatek" became the wish for Poland's regaining its independence. Since that time, "opłatki" are often embossed with religious images. In the 20th century, "opłatek" custom went beyond families and gained another meaning: the meeting of present or past co-workers or students.

== See also ==
- Christmas in Poland
- Aparon
- Oblea
- Flying saucer (confectionery)
