= Eduardo Clark =

Mexican government official (born 1991)

Deputy Secretary in the Secretariat of Health
- Incumbent
- Assumed office 1 October 2024
- President: Claudia Sheinbaum

Personal details
- Born: 1991 (age 34–35) Celaya, Guanajuato, Mexico
- Education: Instituto Tecnológico Autónomo de México

Eduardo Clark García Dobarganes (born 1991) is a Mexican public official serving as Deputy Secretary in the Secretariat of Health since 1 October 2024.

== Early life and education ==
Clark was born in Celaya, Guanajuato, Mexico, in 1991. At age 15, he moved to Fort Worth, Texas, United States, where he completed high school. He later returned to Mexico to start his university studies. He holds an undergraduate degree in political science from the Instituto Tecnológico Autónomo de México.

== Career ==
Between 2012 and 2014, Clark worked as a researcher for the Mexican Institute for Competitiveness (IMCO). In 2014, in a research project conducted alongside colleague Alejandra Zapata, Clark identified several teachers registered in the Secretariat of Public Education (SEP) national payroll system multiple times, with some appearing at least ten times and collecting over MXN$500,000 per month. The investigation also found more than 200 teachers sharing the same date of birth. The findings were presented to Emilio Chuayffet, then head of the SEP, and the Governor of Hidalgo. After that investigation, Clark was offered a job as a data analyst in the federal government.

From 2014 to 2018, Clark held several positions in digital innovation and data policy, including General Director of Digital Inclusion at the Office of the President of Mexico. Among his first projects in the federal government was an investigation into maternal mortality in rural Mexico, which found that women were dying from preventable conditions, including pre-eclampsia and eclampsia, due to delays in seeking medical attention. In partnership with the Secretariat of Health (Spanish: Secretaría de Salud) and UNICEF, Clark and his team developed an SMS reminder system to notify pregnant women of upcoming medical appointments, modeled on a similar program implemented by UNICEF in New York City. In this role, Clark was responsible for configuring the system infrastructure, designing the project, and drafting the SMS messages.

From December 2018 to 30 November 2023, during the mayoral administration of Claudia Sheinbaum, he served as General Director of Digital Government for Mexico City. In that position he was responsible for the city's digital strategy, including the development and implementation of digital government services for residents, such as the citizen services platform Llave CDMX. During his tenure, he acted as a principal spokesperson for the Mexico City government during the COVID-19 pandemic and coordinated the city's testing and vaccination strategy, a position that increased his public profile in Mexico City. He also led the development of an epidemiological model for Mexico City and implemented the city's vaccination plan. On 1 December 2023, Clark was appointed Head of the Mexico City Digital Public Innovation Agency (Spanish: Agencia Digital de Innovación Pública), serving until 30 September 2024.

Following the 2024 Mexican presidential election Clark was named by President Claudia Sheinbaum as Deputy Secretary in the Secretariat of Health. In this role, he oversees the federal government's consolidated procurement and distribution of medicines and medical supplies for Mexico's public health system, including the Mexican Social Security Institute (IMSS), IMSS-Bienestar, and the Institute for Social Security and Services for State Workers (ISSSTE).

== Family ==
Clark's grandfather, Mauricio Clark Ovadía, served as municipal president (mayor) of Celaya from 1980 to 1982. Clark has credited him with inspiring his political aspirations.
