= Oblea =

Wafer dessert

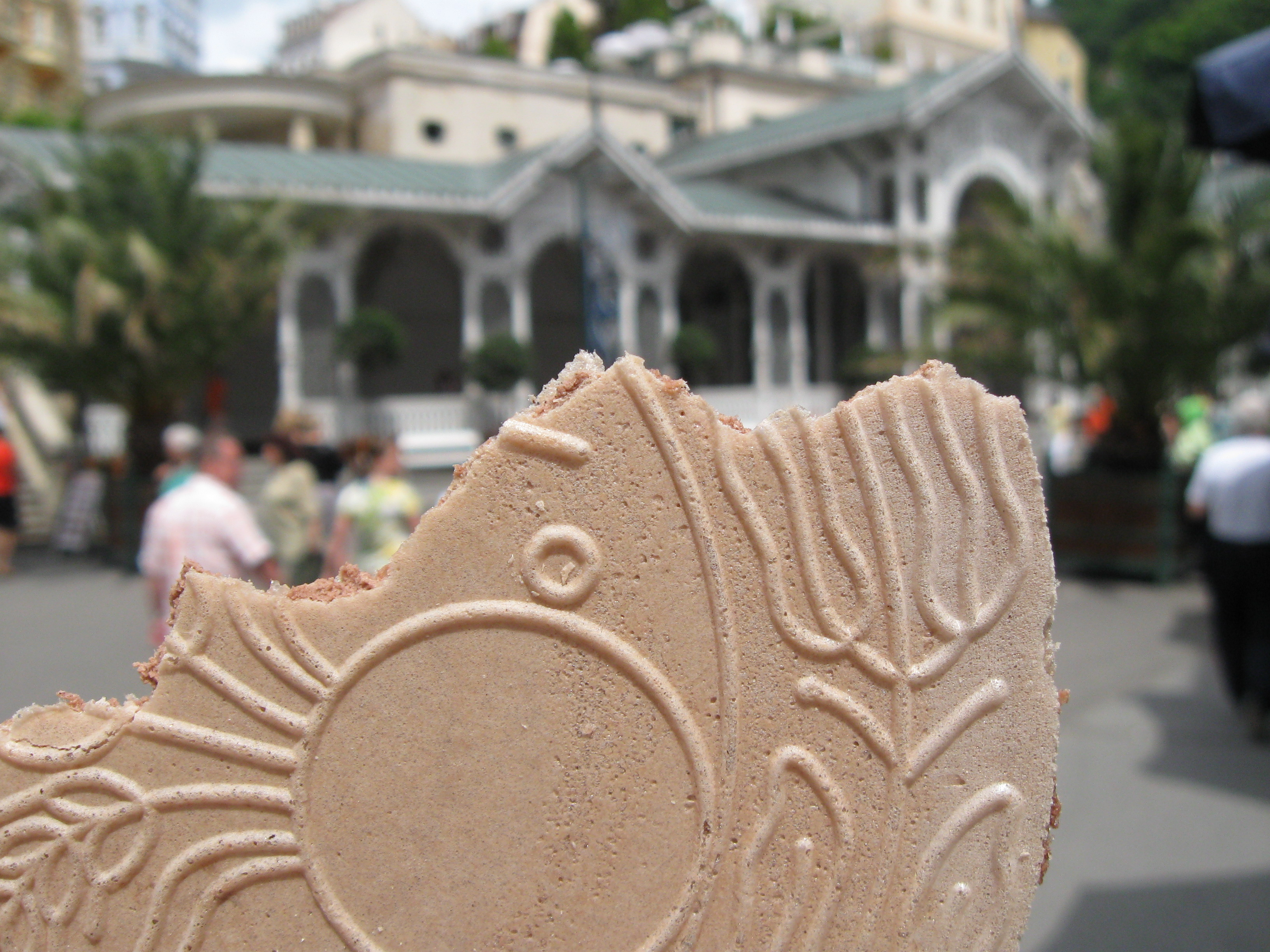
Oblea from Karlovy Vary spa, Czech Republic

Oblea is a type of wafer dessert commonly found in several Latin American countries, particularly in Colombia. It typically consists of two thin, round wafers filled with sweet ingredients. The most common filling is arequipe (a form of caramelized milk), although other fillings may include jam, cheese, fruits, whipped cream, or combinations thereof. Additional toppings such as condensed milk, chocolate, coconut, or fruit sauces are also frequently used.

Obleas are usually prepared by pressing batter between two heated plates, similar to the method used for making waffles, resulting in thin and crisp wafers.

Similar wafer-based confections exist in various European countries. In Germany, for example, wafers are often thin, unleavened biscuits with a sweet filling.

== Etymology ==
The term oblea derives from the Old French words oblaye or obleie, which in turn originate from the Late Latin oblata, meaning “offering” or “bread offered in the Eucharist.” This term is related to oblatus, the past participle of the Latin verb offerre (“to offer”).

Some historical sources suggest a possible connection with the Greek word obelias, which referred to a type of elongated bread cooked on a grill or between plates and traditionally consumed at the end of a meal.

Originally, the term referred to unleavened bread used in the consecration of the Mass. Over time, its meaning expanded to include thin baked wafers similar in form to the Eucharistic host.

== See also ==
- Flying saucer (confectionery)
- Aparon
- Christmas wafer
