= Auditorio Tresguerras =

Arena in Guanajuato, Mexico

Auditorio Francisco Eduardo Tresguerras is a 2,407-seat indoor arena located in Celaya, Guanajuato, Mexico. It was built in 1990 and is used primarily for concerts, basketball, boxing, lucha libre and other special events.

The arena contains a permanent stage and removable floor seating in addition to permanent balcony seating.
