= Rabri =

Condensed-milk-based sweet dish from India

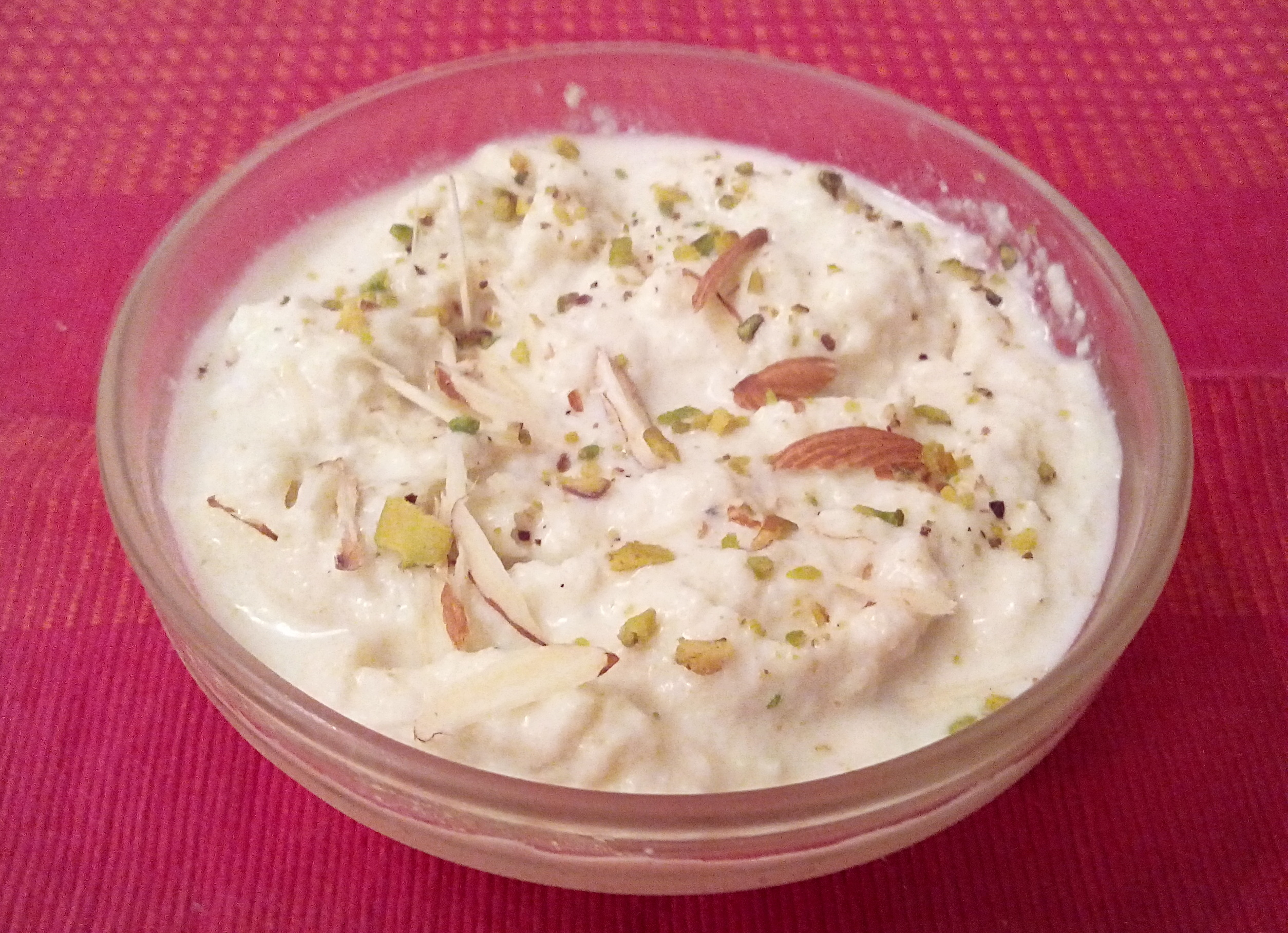
- Alternative names: Rabdi, Rabidi
- Region or state: Indian subcontinent
- Associated cuisine: India, Nepal, Pakistan, Bangladesh
- Main ingredients: Milk and Pearl Millet Flour

Rabri, rabdi or rabidi (IAST: Rabaḍī) is a sweet, condensed-milk-based dish, originating from the Indian subcontinent, made by boiling milk on low heat for a long time until it becomes dense and changes its colour to off-white or pale yellow. Jaggery, spices, and nuts are added to it to give it flavor. It is chilled and served as dessert. Rabri is the main ingredient in several desserts, such as rasabali, chhena kheeri, and khira sagara.

Two similar dishes go by the names Basundi and Khiriha.

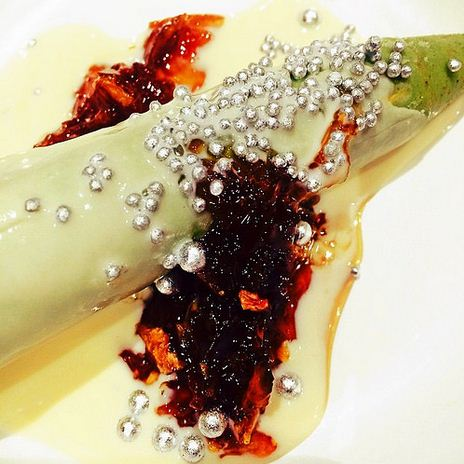
Traditional Indian ice cream kulfi served with sweet rabri and rose petal jam gulkand.

== History ==
Chandimangala mentions rabdi (thickened, sweetened milk), along with other sweets, in the early 1400s.

Rabri was banned in Kolkata 1965 during an economic recession for its excessive use of milk. It was overturned within the year by the Calcutta High Court due to lawsuits from independent sweet shops.

According to some legends, Rabri was first offered to Lord Krishna at the Banke Bihari Temple in Vrindavana by a Rajasthani princess.

== Creation ==
Rabri is made by heating sweetened milk in a large open vessel (kadhai). As the layer of cream begins to form on the surface of the milk, it is taken off and kept aside. The process continues until the milk is exhausted.

== Varieties ==
There are various types of rabri, each with distinct characteristics:

=== Plain Rabri ===
Plain Rabri is prepared by continuously simmering and stirring milk until it reduces and thickens. Sugar and cardamom are commonly added to enhance its flavor.

=== Lachha/Lachhedar Rabri ===
Lachha Rabri is characterized by layers of cream, known as lachhas, which form during the slow cooking process. These layers give it a distinctive texture.

=== Pista Rabri ===
Pista Rabri is characterized by the inclusion of pistachios, which lend a distinct flavor and a greenish tint to the dessert.

=== Kesari Rabri ===
Kesari Rabri is flavored with saffron, giving it a golden hue and a rich, aromatic flavor

=== Malai Rabri ===
Malai Rabri is distinguished by the addition of extra malai (cream), resulting in a richer and more indulgent version compared to the traditional Rabri.

== See also ==
- Basundi, a similar dish
