= Khiriha =

Assamese dairy food

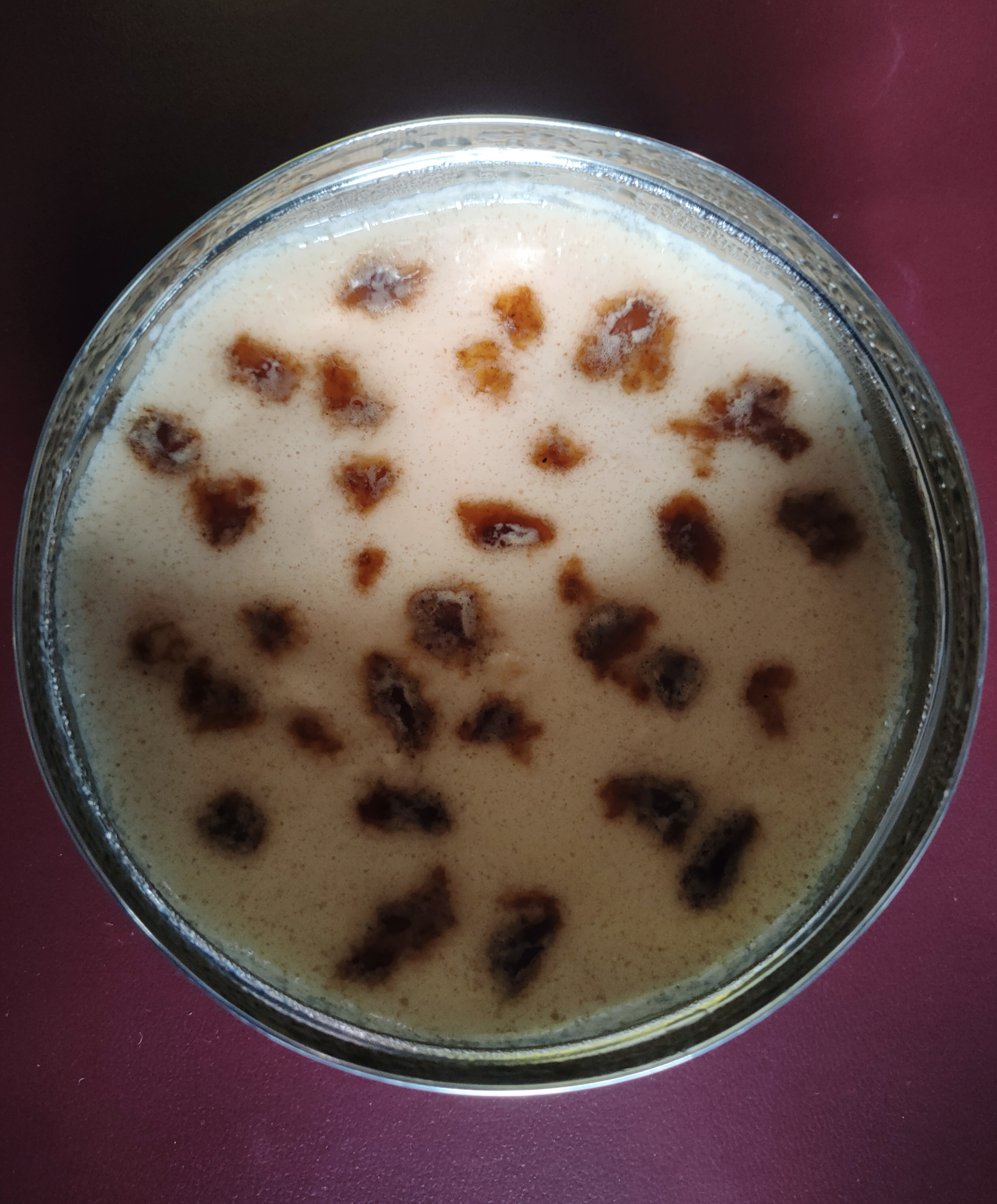
- Khiriha, a traditional Assamese dessert
- Alternative names: Khirixa
- Type: Dairy product
- Course: Dessert
- Place of origin: India
- Region or state: Assam
- Main ingredients: Whole milk and jaggery or sugar

Khiriha, or khirixa (Assamese pronunciation: [kʰiˈɹihä]) is a condensed milk dessert traditionally made in Assam, India. Its preparation involves boiling milk with jaggery or sugar added and reducing it by evaporation to a thick consistency over a low flame.

== History ==
The history of khiriha goes long back. It has been mentioned in many sources such as the 14th century Saptakanda Ramayana, 16th century Gurucharit (a biography of Sankardeva) and others. For example, a verse in Early Assamese from Sankaracharita where Satyasandha, Sankardeva's mother asks their home worker Chandari to make khiriha (earlier khirisa) for Sankardeva:

Satyasandhā bole ore Candarī suniyo, Saṅkaraka lāgi ghana khirisā kariyo.

— Bhusana Dvija, Sankara charita
Translation:

Satyasandha says, "Oh Chandari, listen, make some condensed khirisā for Sankara."

— Translation

Khiriha is also often mentioned in literature among other desserts and other foods. Such as in the 18th century Katha Gurucharita:

Khirāba zanā xewą arthe katok khir, keho khirihā, kato kalahunu, keho dai, kato dugdha, keho kāsi dai, kator ghrita, katoko ghol, keho xarkarā, katoehe amrit.

== Sources ==
- Barua, Hemchandra (2023). Baruah, Jayanta (ed.). Hemkosh: An Etymological Dictionary of the Assamese Language (in Assamese and English) (15th Revised ed.). Guwahati: Hemkosh Prakashan. p. 385.
