= Instituto Universitario del Centro de México =

Private university-colleges in Mexico

- University Institute of Central Mexico (English)
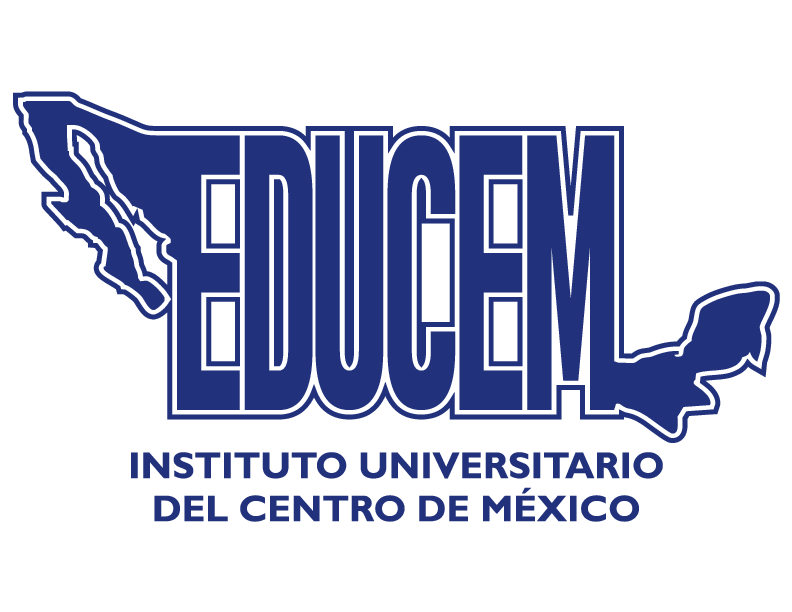
- Type: Private
- Established: 2001; 25 years ago
- Students: c. 33,000
- Location: Mexico
- Website: educem.mx

The Instituto Universitario del Centro de México (University Institute of Central Mexico) (EDUCEM in Mexico; UCEM in León, Guanajuato) is a private Mexican university-preparatory based in León, Guanajuato.

es:Instituto Universitario del Centro de México

It was founded in 2001 starting with 2 campuses in the city of León, Guanajuato and with which it would expand in 2003 throughout Guanajuato in 2004 and later it would expand in other states of Mexico, it offers different fields of study and has 128 campuses in 18 states of Mexico has 33,000 students around Mexico.
