= Basundi =

Indian sweet

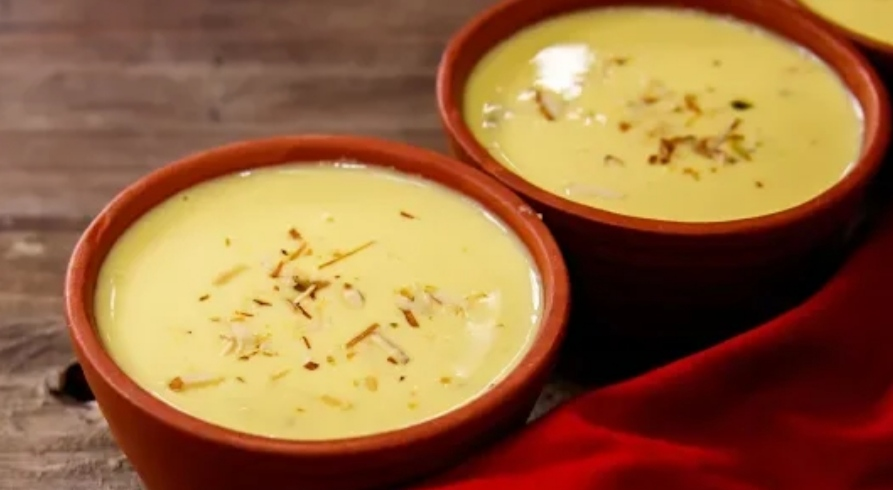
- Basundi in Maharashtra
- Course: Dessert
- Place of origin: Maharashtra, India Gujarat , India
- Region or state: Maharashtra, Tamil Nadu, Andhra Pradesh, Gujarat, Karnataka, Telangana
- Main ingredients: Milk, sugar, cardamom, saffron

Basundi (Gujarati: બાસુંદી, Kannada: ಬಾಸುಂದಿ, Marathi: बासुंदी, Tamil: பாசந்தி, Telugu: బాసుంది) is an Indian sweet mostly in Maharashtra, Gujarat, Andhra Pradesh, Telangana, Tamil Nadu and Karnataka. It is a sweetened condensed milk made by boiling milk on low heat until the milk is reduced by half. In North India, a similar dish goes by the name rabri.

It is often made on Hindu festivals such as Kali Chaudas and Bhaubeej (Bhai Dooj).

Different styles of basundi are also prepared, such as sitaphal (custard apple) basundi and angoor basundi (basundi with smaller kinds of rasgullas).

== Preparation ==
Heavy cream may be added during the boiling process to hasten the thickening process. Once reduced, a little sugar, cardamom, charoli, and/or saffron are added. Basundi is preserved well after sugar is added. Sugar develops some acidity over a period of time. If it is excessive, then it can curdle the basundi. Sometimes after adding sugar, one cooks it for some more time; this gives a nice pink color to basundi, as sugar is also cooked in milk turning into a light caramel. Before adding sugar, basundi is thick, but after adding, it becomes fluid again. Stirring well prevents malai from being formed on top and all guests (even late comers) can enjoy equally thick and plain basundi. Basundi is served chilled, often garnished with slices of almonds and pistachios. The addition of condensed milk gives a nice flavour and richness to basundi.

== How to serve ==
Basundi can be served hot, warm or chilled. It is often served with puris (fried Indian flatbread).

== Ingredients ==
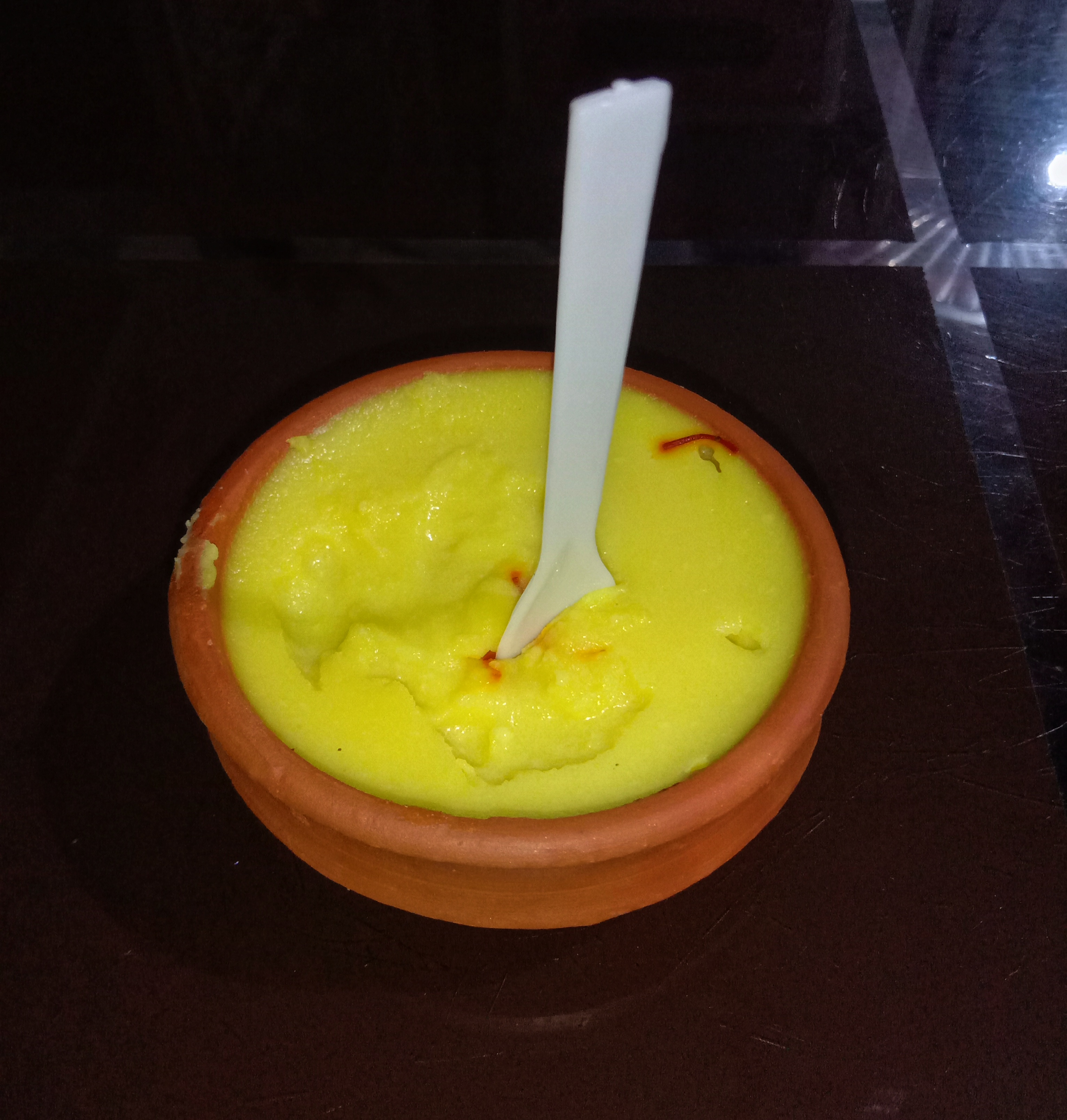
A matka full of frozen Saffron Basundi

This milk that is flavored with cardamom powder and saffron basundi varies as per the quantity of saffron. Add less for mild colour. The addition of condensed milk gives a nice flavour and wealth to basundi.

== Nutritional value ==
- Milk - Milk provides daily allowance of Calcium. The calcium in milk protects teeth and bones. Protein is another key nutrient which milk is rich in - 8.6g.
- Almonds - Almonds are rich in B complex vitamins such as Vitamin B1, Vitamin B3, Thiamine, Niacine and Folate which plays an important role in brain development.

== Regional variants ==
=== Narsobawadi ===
Narsobawadi Basundi is a variant from Narsobawadi, Maharashtra. It is a sweetened dense milk made by boiling milk on low heat until the milk is reduced.

== See also ==
- Rabri, a thicker variant
