= Aparon =

Filipino dessert made from unconsecrated communion wafers

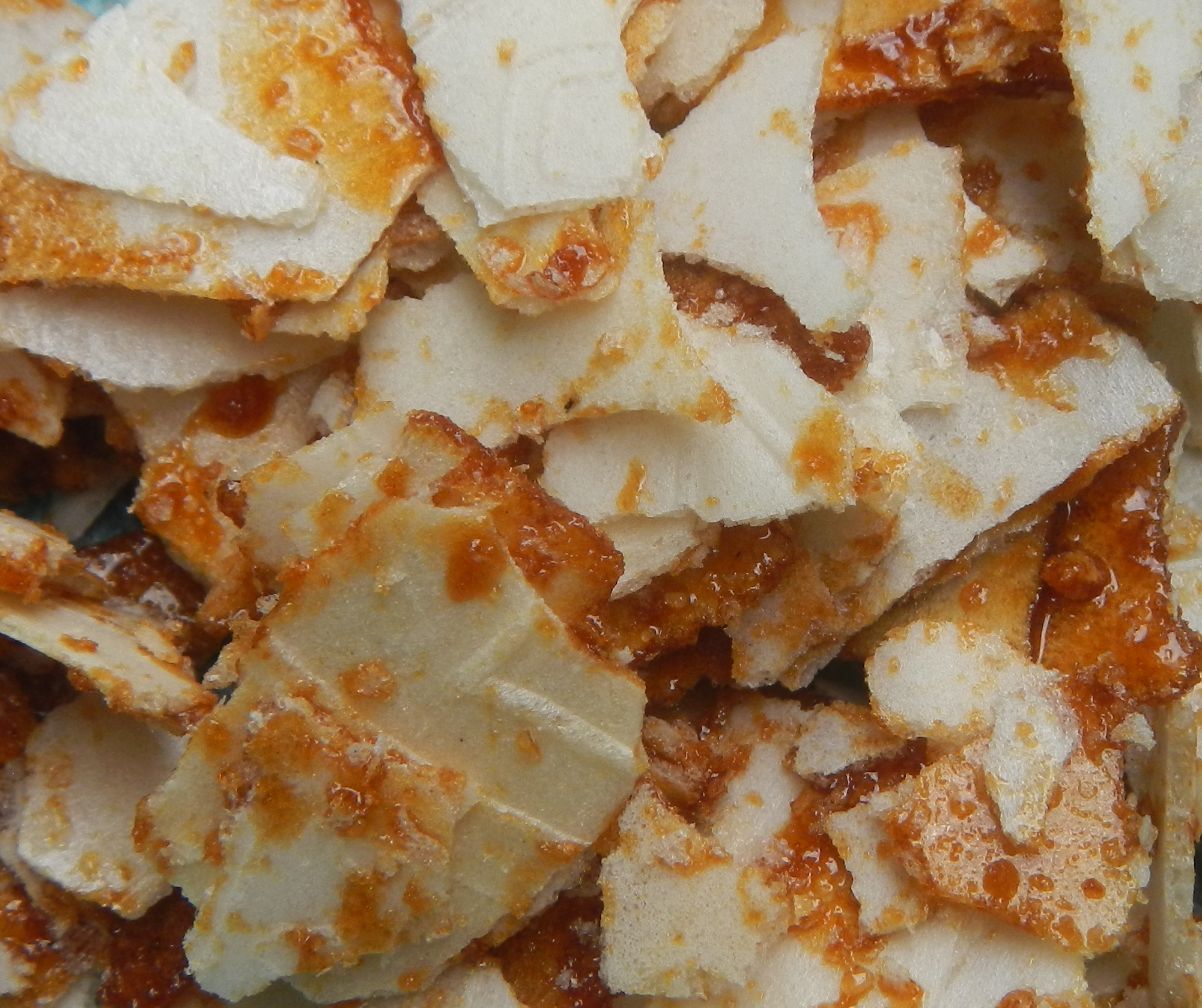
- Type: Wafer
- Course: Dessert
- Place of origin: Philippines
- Region or state: Malolos, Bulacan, Central Luzon
- Created by: Socorro V. Malonzo
- Invented: 1972
- Main ingredients: Wheat flour, water, sugar
- Ingredients generally used: Sesame seeds
- Variations: Angel cookies / Cloister cookies

Aparon (from apa, “wafer" and chicharrón, "crackling") is a Filipino dessert made from toasted unconsecrated hostia (communion wafers) drizzled with caramelized sugar and, optionally, sesame seeds.

It was invented in 1972 by Socorro Vistan Malonzo who learned to bake communion wafers from the Augustinian Sisters of Our Lady of Consolation of the Colegio de Nuestra Señora del Carmen (now La Consolacion University) in Malolos, Bulacan. Her business supplied communion wafers to nearby churches in the province and neighbouring Pampanga as a means of livelihood. She invented the dessert in an effort to make better use of the full communion wafer sheet, instead of having the trimmings disposed of as fish and animal feed.

A variant known as angel cookies was invented in the mid-1980s by Sister Anesilde Antonio of the Missionary Sisters Servants of the Holy Spirit. While also making use of the excess cuttings of communion wafers, her dessert differs in that the wafers are incorporated into cookie dough in a similar fashion to chocolate chip cookies.

== See also ==
- Christmas wafer
- Kiping
- Barquillo
