= Susie A. Parks =

American telephone operator (1895–1981)

Susie Parks
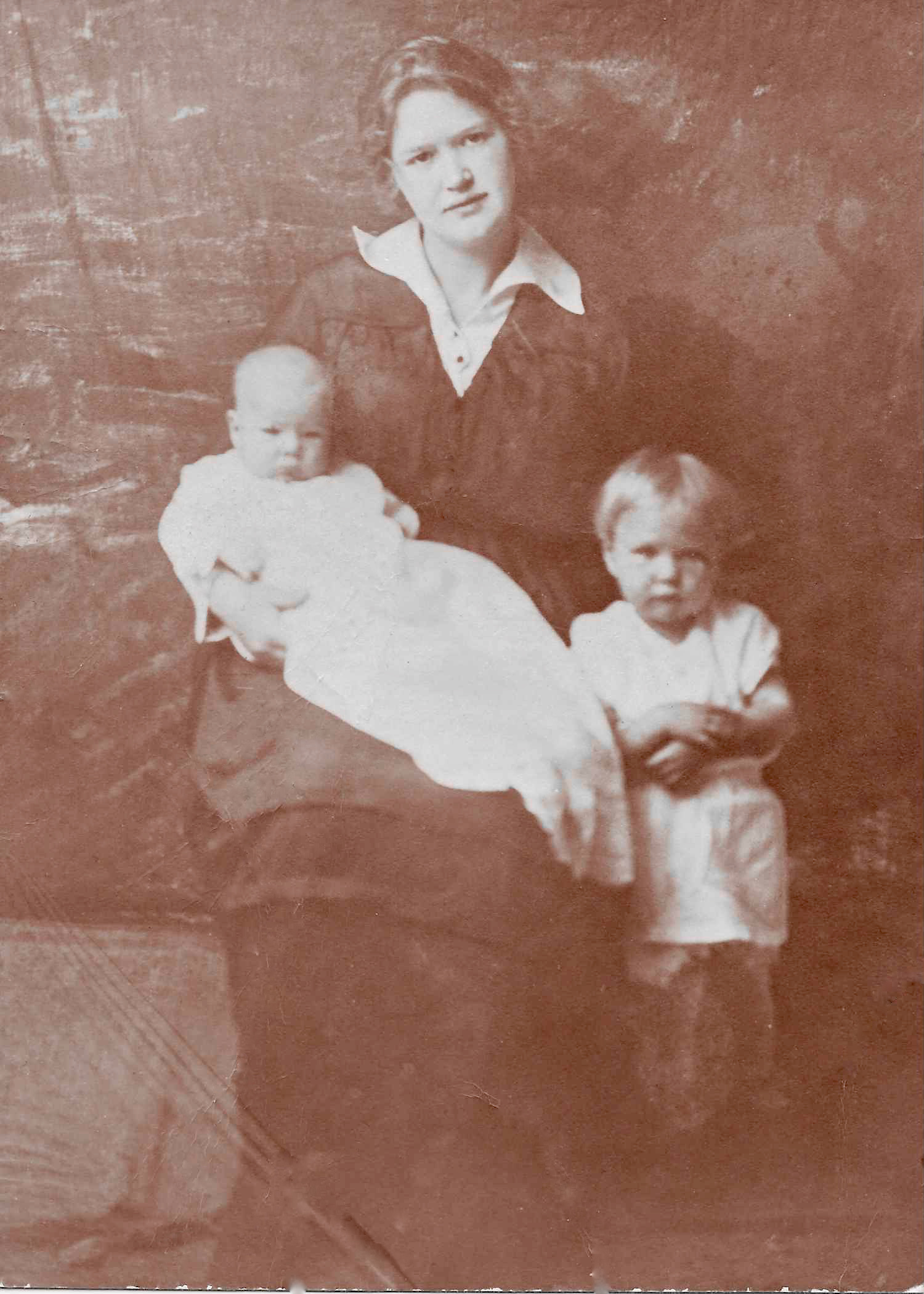
- Susie Parks with children
- Born: October 22, 1895; Cinebar, Washington, U.S.
- Died: April 22, 1981 (aged 85); Puyallup, Washington, U.S.
- Occupations: Printer, Switchboard Operator, Waitress, Sheet Metalist

Susie Ashcraft Gregg Parks Kendrick (October 22, 1895 – April 19, 1981) was the telephone switchboard operator of the southern New Mexico town of Columbus, on the southern border of the United States. She alerted the contingent of the National Guard located in Deming, New Mexico, during the Battle of Columbus skirmish, on March 9, 1916, where Francisco "Pancho" Villa and an estimated 400 of his men planned to invade several small cities in southern New Mexico. She was recognized and celebrated for her actions, which may have saved lives in Columbus and the surrounding counties.

== The raid ==
On March 9, 1916, Susie was 19 years old, five months pregnant and in her apartment at the back of the Columbus Courier newspaper office with her 15-month-old baby. Her husband, G.E. Parks, was the publisher and editor of the Columbus Courier, and away for the night. Francisco "Pancho" Villa's spies who, upon inspecting the town the week before, did not locate the telephone switchboard, which was now housed in the Courier office due to a fire at telephone office two months prior. Before the attack, Villa's soldiers cut the telephone line to El Paso, Texas, but the line to Deming, New Mexico, remained intact. In the early morning hours of March 9, she placed a distress call to Deming and alerted Captain A. W. Brock, commanding officer of 1st Company of the National Guard. She remained at the switchboard until Villa's army was driven back over the border, and she was relieved of her post at the switchboard by a 13th infantry cavalry soldier. During the raid Parks was shot in the neck, and both she and the baby were covered in glass fragments from broken windows damaged by gunfire.

== Early life ==
Susie Gregg (Born Susie Ashcraft Gregg, although she is often referred to as "Susan Parks" in print), began her early years in Kirkland, Washington. She was the youngest of seven children born to David Duncan and Eliza Jane Gregg. They traveled by covered wagon from Nebraska to Washington, Washington to Montana, then back to Washington State. At age 12, after her brother was killed by a log roll on Lake Washington, the family took a train to Columbus, New Mexico. She left school after the eighth grade. While in Columbus she rode her horse, hunted in the Columbus desert, and worked on the family homestead.

At age 17, she met Garnet E. Parks, a soldier assigned to the 12th Infantry at the Post of Columbus, and they married on February 6, 1914. He later bought the Columbus Courier and served as the Editor and Publisher. Together they produced the paper, ran the print shop, and lived in an apartment in the back of the newspaper office. In January 1916, a fire broke out at Burton's telephone office, which is why the switchboard was at the Courier newspaper office during Villa's attack.

== Recognition ==
On August 27, 1916, the wife of L. Bradford Prince, New Mexico's territorial governor, and the Daughters of the American Revolution recognized her for her heroism at the Crystal Theater in Columbus. They presented her with a gold watch, and a 46-piece set of sterling silverware. The inscription read:

Mrs. S. A. Parks in recognition of heroic devotion to duty, Columbus, New Mexico, March 9th, 1916. From Mary C. Prince and friends in New York

To her daughter, Gwenyth Parks, they presented a silver cup lined with gold and an inscription:

To Gwenyth Parks. Commemorating your mother's heroism at Columbus, N.M., March 9th, 1916 -from Mary C. Prince

It was reported that, upon his arrival from Fort Bliss, General John J. Pershing visited Susie at the Courier office to praise her for her heroism in remaining at her post throughout the battle.

An Official Scenic Historic Marker was placed at the intersection of New Mexico Highway 9 and Highway 11 in Columbus by the New Mexico Historic Preservation Division in October 2016.

== Later years ==
Susie and Garnet stayed in Columbus for several years after the attack on Columbus in 1916 and through the conclusion of the Punitive Expedition. In 1919, they traveled with their three children to Washington State where they established the Tenino Independent newspaper in June 1922. Garnet became ill and nearly died after a gallbladder surgery punctured his bowels. When the puncture was discovered, he began to recover but was left with a morphine dependency that crippled him, and the family that had grown to five children. They acquired the Clackamas News in Estacada, Oregon but the stress was too much. They separated in June 1929 after the birth of their sixth child and before the birth of their seventh. They had planned for him to get help for his drug dependency, but soon afterwards her letters were returned, and she never heard from him again. She filed for divorce in August 1930.

Susie raised their seven children in Kirkland, Washington. She worked as a ferry boat waitress and as an aircraft sheet metal mechanic during World War II. In 1946, she married Delco Kendrick and the two spent their remaining years traveling the country, visiting their children and grandchildren, playing music, and square dancing.
