= Battle of Parral =

- Part of the Border War, Pancho Villa Expedition
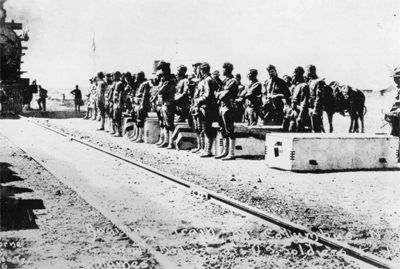
- Men of the 13th Cavalry waiting to embark on a train in Columbus, New Mexico, to load the coffins of the soldiers killed in the raid. during the Pancho Villa Expedition.
| Date | April 12, 1916 |
| Location | near Parral, Chihuahua, Mexico |
| Result | Mexican victory |

Belligerents
| United States | Mexico |

Commanders and leaders
| (United States) Frank Tompkins (WIA) | (Mexico) Ismael Lozano |

Strength
| ~150 cavalry | ~70–120 cavalry |

Casualties and losses
| 5 killed 6 wounded | 7 killed or wounded |

The Battle of Parral, on April 12, 1916, was the first battle between soldiers of Venustiano Carranza, known as Carrancistas, and the United States military during the Mexican Expedition. When a small force of American cavalry was leaving the city of Parral, in the Mexican state of Chihuahua, a superior force of Carrancista soldiers attacked which resulted in a bloody running engagement. Using a strategy of organized withdrawal, the Americans were able to repulse the Mexican attacks and safely escape to the fortified village of Santa Cruz de Villegas.

== Battle ==
In early April 1916, Major Frank Tompkins, who fought in the Battle of Columbus, persuaded the expedition commander, General John J. Pershing, to allow him to lead eight officers and 120 men of Troops K and M, 13th Cavalry, on a raid deep into Mexican territory. Tompkins' intentions were to chase and eventually engage the elusive rebels of Pancho Villa. After preparations were completed, Major Tompkins left camp on or about April 5. The Americans made a quick ride across the Mexican desert, traveling eighty-five miles in fifty hours. Following several days in the wilderness, Tompkins wrote; "We were ragged, shoes were gone and nearly everyone had a beard. We certainly presented a hard-boiled, savage appearance." The Americans were hoping to rest at Parral for a day, and they were told they'd be welcome by a Carrancista officer along the way. However, when the column arrived at Parral in the early morning of April 12, the Constitutionalist commander of the city, General Ismael Lozano, informed Major Tompkins that coming to the city was a bad idea and that he must leave immediately. Tompkins agreed so the Americans left Parral not long after getting there.

On the way out of town, a group of Mexicans began shouting "Viva Villa", and other phrases, so Tompkins shouted the same back. A few minutes later, as the column was just outside town, a mounted force of about 550 Carrancistas launched an attack on the American column. In the first few shots a sergeant standing next to Tompkins was killed and a second man seriously wounded. Heavily outnumbered, Tompkins had no choice but to keep going, and he dismounted a rear guard to take up positions on a small hill and delay the pursuing Mexicans. In this first skirmish, about twenty-five Mexicans were killed and the rest driven off. The rear guard then regrouped with the main force, where they soon withstood another attack. During this second skirmish, another forty-five Mexicans were killed. Tompkins continued his march to Santa Cruz de Villegas, a fortified town, eight miles from Parral, that the Americans could defend. Though by the time of their arrival the fighting had ceased. The Mexicans were not far away, Tompkins was facing the possibility of his 100-man force being besieged by hundreds of Carrancistas, so he sent out dispatch riders for reinforcements.

Just before 8:00 am, a force of Buffalo Soldiers, from the 10th Cavalry, arrived. They had recently engaged about 150 Villistas at the Battle of Agua Caliente on April 1. Following the arrival of reinforcements, the Mexicans retreated back to Parral, there was no more fighting. Two Americans were killed in the battle and six others were wounded, including Tompkins. For the Mexicans, they suffered the loss of between fourteen and seventy killed or wounded, depending on varying accounts.

== Aftermath ==
The Battle of Parral was a turning point in the Mexican Expedition, it marked America's furthest penetration into Mexico during the operation, 516 miles from the border, and marked the beginning of a slow withdrawal from Mexico which ended in early 1917. General Pershing was encamped at Satevo, eighty miles north of Parral, when he heard news of the engagement at Parral. According to the journalist Frank B. Elser, of The New York Times, Pershing was "mad as hell" so he demanded that the Carrancista government, which by then was in control of Mexico, to make a formal apology. It never came and it made General Pershing believe that instead of fighting just the rebels of Pancho Villa, he would now have to engage the "more numerous" Carrancista army. Pershing even requested permission from his commanding officer, General Frederick Funston, to capture both the state and capital of Chihuahua, but it was denied.

== Bibliography ==
- Boot, Max (2003). The Savage Wars of Peace: Small Wars and the Rise of American Power. New York: Basic Books. ISBN 046500721X. LCCN 2004695066.
