= Herbert Jermain Slocum =

American cavalry officer (1855–1928)

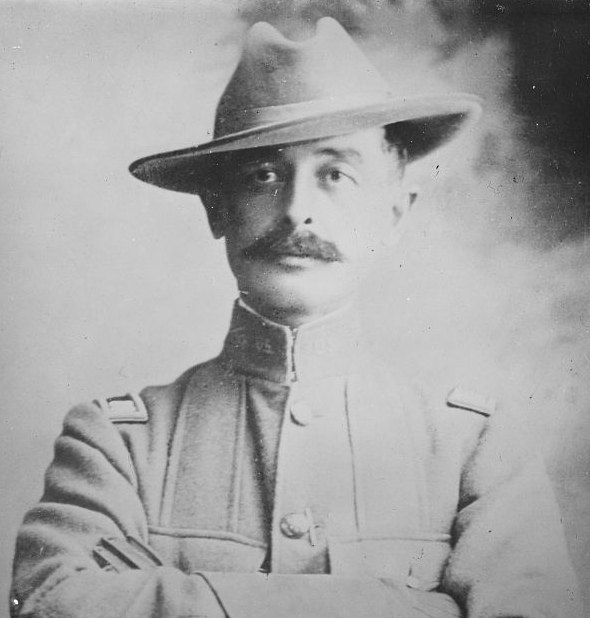
- Slocum 1915
- Born: April 25, 1855; Cincinnati, Ohio
- Died: March 29, 1928 (aged 72); Washington, DC
- Military career
- Service years: 1876 - 1919
- Rank: Colonel
- Commands: 13th Cavalry Regiment
- Conflicts: Battle of Columbus, New Mexico

Herbert Jermain Slocum (April 25, 1855 - March 29, 1928) was in charge of the 13th Cavalry Regiment during the Battle of Columbus, New Mexico in 1916 where Pancho Villa burned several buildings in Columbus, New Mexico, stole weapons and horses and killed 18 Americans.

== Biography ==
Colonel Herbert J. Slocum was born on April 25, 1855, in Cincinnati, Ohio to Colonel Joseph Jermain Slocum (1833-1924) and Sallie Hommedieu. He was an eighth generation descendant of Plymouth Colony militia commander Captain Myles Standish.

Slocum was appointed to the United States Military Academy on July 1, 1872, but left the academy shortly after failing to graduate in 1876. Nevertheless, he received a commission in the US Army shortly afterwards. Solcum was assigned to the 7th Cavalry Regiment where he rose to the rank of captain in 1896. He spent most of his early career posted in the Dakota Territory. He graduated from the Infantry and Cavalry School in 1883.

During the Spanish–American War, Slocum was commissioned as major in the Inspector General branch in May 1898 and reverted to his permanent rank of captain a year later. He served in the occupation of Cuba from 1901 to 1902 and the Philippine Insurrection from 1905 to 1906. He was stationed in the Mid-West (mostly at Fort Riley in Kansas) from 1906 to 1910. He returned to the Philippines in 1911.

In August 1912, Slocum was promoted to colonel and assigned to Fort Leavenworth in Kansas. On September 1, 1914, he took command of the 13th Cavalry Regiment at Cavalry Camp Columbus in Columbus, New Mexico. He commanded the regiment during the Battle of Columbus on March 9, 1916, where Mexican revolutionary Pancho Villa burned several buildings in Columbus, New Mexico. Although Villa's forces were successful in capturing 300 rifles and shotguns, 80 horses, and 30 mules it came at the cost of at least 70 of his men being killed compared with American casualties of 8 soldiers and 10 civilians (including a pregnant woman) killed. Slocum was exonerated for his failure to prevent the attack by a board of inquiry led by United States Secretary of War Newton Diehl Baker, Jr.

Solcum remained on active duty with the Army through World War I and retired from the Army when he reached the mandatory retirement age of 64 on April 25, 1919.

Colonel Slocum died on March 29, 1928, in Washington, DC and is buried in Arlington National Cemetery. His estate was valued at over 3 million dollars.

== Memberships ==
Colonel Slocum was a hereditary member of the Military Order of the Loyal Legion of the United States, the Order of the Indian Wars of the United States, the Society of Colonial Wars and the General Society of Mayflower Descendants.

== Military awards ==
- Indian Campaign Medal
- Spanish War Service Medal
- Army of Cuban Occupation Medal
- Philippine Campaign Medal
- Cuban Pacification Medal
- Mexican Border Service Medal
- World War I Victory Medal

== Dates of rank ==
- Cadet, United States Military Academy - 1 July 1872
- 2nd Lieutenant, 25th Infantry - 26 July 1876
- 2nd Lieutenant, 2nd Cavalry - 18 August 1876
- 2nd Lieutenant, 7th Cavalry - 20 September 1876 (to rank from 28 July 1876)
- Brevet 1st Lieutenant - 13 September 1877 (awarded on 27 February 1890)
- 1st Lieutenant, 7th Cavalry - 22 September 1883
- Captain, 7th Cavalry - 26 August 1896
- Major, Inspector General, Volunteers - 24 May 1898
- Discharged from Volunteers - 12 May 1899
- Captain, Quartermaster Corps - 25 July 1902
- Major, 1st Cavalry - 26 August 1903
- Major, 2nd Cavalry - 16 October 1903
- Major, 7th Cavalry - 26 February 1908
- Lieutenant Colonel, Cavalry (detached service) - 3 March 1911
- Colonel, Cavalry (detached service) - 2 August 1912
- Colonel, Cavalry, Commandant, United States Military Prison, Fort Leavenworth, Kansas (rank and position indicated on an August 17, 1914 Memorandum; sent from “The Adjutant General of the Army,” to Colonel Slocum)
- Colonel, 13th Cavalry - 1 September 1914
- Colonel, Retired List - April 25, 1919
