= Frank Tompkins =

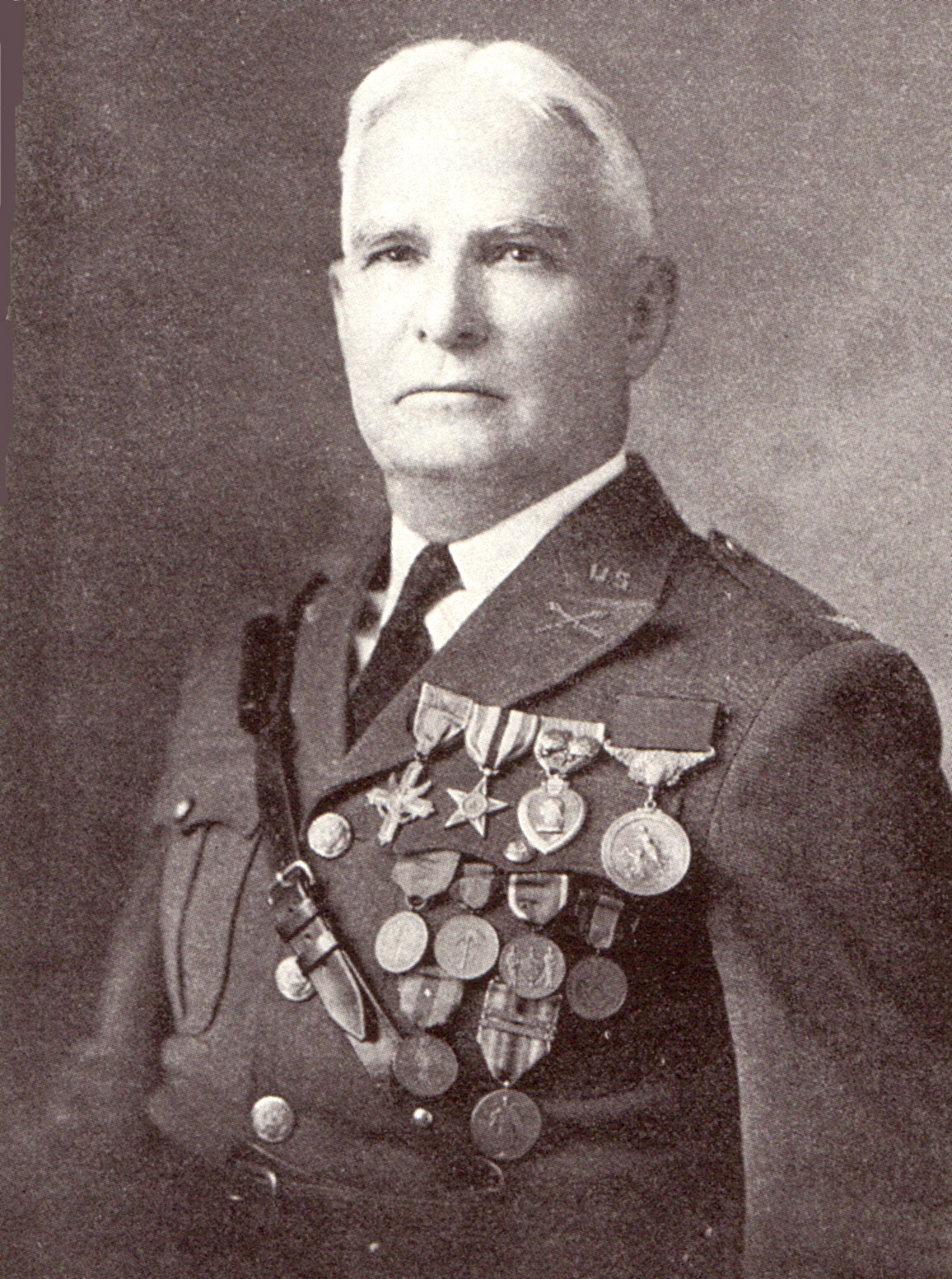
- Born: September 28, 1868; Washington, D.C., US
- Died: December 21, 1954 (aged 86); Northfield, Vermont, US
- Military career
- Allegiance: United States
- Branch: US Army
- Service years: 1891–1923
- Rank: Colonel
- Conflicts: Spanish–American War Philippine–American War; Border War: Battle of Columbus; Battle of Parral; World War I: Western Front
- Awards: Distinguished Service Cross; Silver Star; Purple Heart (3)
- Other work: Author

Colonel Frank Tompkins (September 28, 1868 – December 21, 1954) was an officer in the United States Army. Tompkins served in numerous conflicts including the Spanish–American War, the Philippine–American War, the Mexican Border War, and World War I. Recommended by General John J. Pershing for the Medal of Honor, he was awarded the Distinguished Service Cross for his leadership during the 1916 Battle of Columbus, New Mexico.

== Early life ==
Tompkins was born September 28, 1868, in Washington, D.C., one of three surviving sons of Brevet Brigadier General Charles Henry Tompkins, an officer in the United States Army, and Augusta Root (Hobbie) Tompkins.

Educated at private schools in St. Paul Minnesota and Chicago, Illinois, Tompkins graduated from Shattuck Military Academy and Braden's (West Point) Preparatory School at Cornwall-on-Hudson, New York. On April 23, 1890, he was awarded the Silver Lifesaving Medal for rescuing a sailor from drowning in the Narrows off Governors Island in New York City on July 27, 1889.

== Military career ==
=== Early career ===
Although his father and grandfather were alumni of the Military Academy, Frank Tompkins eschewed an appointment himself and entered the Army directly from civilian life, commissioned a second lieutenant in the 8th Cavalry on August 1, 1891. Three months later he accepted an open second lieutenant's position with the 7th Cavalry, where he remained until 1898. In 1897 he graduated from the Infantry and Cavalry School at Fort Leavenworth, Kansas.

=== Philippines ===
Tompkins was promoted to first lieutenant in the 2nd Cavalry on July 12, 1898, and to captain in the newly created 11th Cavalry in February 1901, commanding Troop G in Batangas Province in the Philippines between March 1901 and March 1904. His unit engaged in counter-guerrilla operations against General Miguel Malvar and his 3,000 insurrectos during the successful final campaign of the Philippine–American War between December 1, 1901, and April 30, 1902. Tompkins accompanied the regiment to its new station at Fort Des Moines, Iowa. From October 1906 to March 1909 his unit served in Cuba as part of the Army of Pacification. In September 1910 Tompkins became a professor of military science in tactics at Norwich University, Vermont. He served three tours as its commandant of cadets, from 1910 to 1913, 1916–1917, and 1919–1923.

=== Mexico ===
On March 9, 1916, Tompkins, now a major, commanded the 3rd Squadron of the 13th Cavalry at Columbus, New Mexico and was acting as regimental executive officer when it was attacked by revolutionary forces under Pancho Villa. Using a small force of two troops (approximately 60 men), he pursued Villa's much larger force 15 miles into Mexico, engaged its rear guard four times (the first was a mounted charge) and inflicted severe casualties reported as 75 to 100 dead without losing a man. During the Punitive Expedition that ensued, Tompkins led several provisional squadrons in "flying columns" deep into Mexico in search of Villa. Encountering hostile troops of the de facto Carranza government at the Battle of Parral, Tompkins retreated, conducting a rear guard action to avoid an all-out battle likely to result in war between the United States and Mexico. He was wounded twice during the campaign, in the knee during the Villa raid on Columbus and in the chest and shoulder from a rifle bullet at Parral. He returned to Norwich in September 1916 for his second tour as commandant while recuperating from his wounds.

In 1918 Tompkins received the Distinguished Service Medal for valor at Columbus and in Mexico. The award was upgraded in 1934 to the Distinguished Service Cross, a decoration second only to the Medal of Honor.

=== World War I ===
After the United States entered World War I, Tompkins became a lieutenant colonel in May 1917 and ordered to the 18th Cavalry Regiment. Before this took place, however, he was promoted to colonel in June and his orders changed to take command of the 301st Infantry Regiment ("Boston's Own"), 76th Division, being formed for training at Camp Devens, Massachusetts. He sailed with his regiment to France on July 6, 1918, and on arrival found that the division had been designated by the American Expeditionary Force as one of six depot divisions to receive, train, and process replacement troops. Tompkins asked Pershing, now commanding the AEF, for transfer to a combat division and was assigned command of the 110th Infantry of the 28th Division on the Vesle River. He reported August 12 and led the 110th during the Oise-Aisne Campaign until September 7, when he was severely wounded and temporarily blinded at Baslieux-lès-Fismes in a mustard gas attack. Tompkins was hospitalized near Paris until November and found unfit for further front line duty.

=== Later career ===
Tompkins returned to the United States in December 1918, stationed at Fort Myer, Virginia, until March 1919, when he again became a professor and commandant of cadets at Norwich.

== Retirement and death ==
He was retired on July 1, 1920, with a service disability in a reorganization of the army but was immediately recalled to duty until 1923 to finish his tour at Norwich. He then retired again but remained affiliated with Norwich as a trustee until his death in 1954 at the age of eighty-six.

== Family ==
Tompkins came from a noted military family. His father, Charles Henry Tompkins, received the Medal of Honor for leading his troop of the U.S. 5th Cavalry in a mounted charge at the Battle of Fairfax Court House during the American Civil War, and was brevetted a brigadier general. The elder Tompkins later became Assistant Quartermaster General of the United States Army with the rank of colonel.

His great-great-uncle, Daniel D. Tompkins, was the sixth Vice President of the United States and, earlier, the Governor of New York. His grandfather, Colonel Daniel D. Tompkins, was an 1820 graduate of the United States Military Academy, and a veteran of the Mexican War and the Civil War. Tompkins's older brother was Colonel Selah "Tommy" Tompkins, a career officer with the 7th Cavalry who was its lieutenant colonel during the Punitive Expedition and led American forces during the Third Battle of Ciudad Juarez in 1919. His younger brother, also named Daniel D. Tompkins, became a colonel during World War I.

Tompkins married Alice Gertrude Barr, daughter of Colonel Thomas F. Barr (later Judge Advocate General of the United States Army), on January 4, 1893, while stationed on Governors Island. They had two sons, the first dying in infancy. Tompkins' second son, Francis Parker Tompkins, was born in 1896 at Fort Leavenworth and graduated from West Point in 1918. While a major serving in the Office of Chief of Cavalry, Francis Tompkins served in June 1940 as the cavalry branch representative on the subcommittee of the Ordnance Technical Committee responsible for drawing up the specifications for the development of the jeep, and during World War II commanded Combat Command R of the 7th Armored Division from the Battle of the Bulge to the end of hostilities.

== Legacy ==
In 1934 his book, Chasing Villa, was published and is considered the most comprehensive account of the Punitive Expedition by a participant. Tompkins Hall, now a wing of the Technology Center in the Engineering, Math and Science Complex, was dedicated to him in February 1952.

== Awards ==
- Distinguished Service Cross
- Silver Star
- Purple Heart with two oak leaf clusters
- Silver Lifesaving Medal
- Spanish War Service Medal
- Philippine Campaign Medal
- Army of Cuban Pacification Medal
- Mexican Service Medal
- World War I Victory Medal

=== Distinguished Service Cross citation ===
The Distinguished Service Cross is presented to Frank Tompkins, Major, U.S. Army, for extraordinary heroism in action at Columbus, New Mexico, March 9, 1916. Major Tompkins requested and received authority to pursue a superior force of bandits into Mexico. Although wounded early in the pursuit, he carried on a running fight with the bandits for several miles, inflicting heavy losses upon them and stopped the pursuit only when men and horses were exhausted and ammunition was reduced to a few rounds per man. General Orders No. 8, W.D., 1934.

== Dates of rank ==
No pin insignia in 1891	Second Lieutenant, 8th Cavalry, Regular Army: August 1, 1891
No pin insignia in 1891	Second Lieutenant, 7th Cavalry, Regular Army: October 24, 1891
	First Lieutenant, 2nd Cavalry, Regular Army: July 13, 1898
	Captain, 11th Cavalry, Regular Army: February 2, 1901
	Captain, 10th Cavalry, Regular Army: March 14, 1913
	Major, 13th Cavalry, Regular Army: April 5, 1915
	Lieutenant Colonel, Cavalry, Regular Army: May 15, 1917
	Colonel, Infantry, National Army: August 5, 1917; Reverted to permanent rank January 18, 1920.
	Colonel, Cavalry, Retired List: July 1, 1920; Retained on active duty until September 15, 1923.
