= Battle of Columbus (1916) =

Raid on Columbus, New Mexico, US, by a Mexican revolutionary force

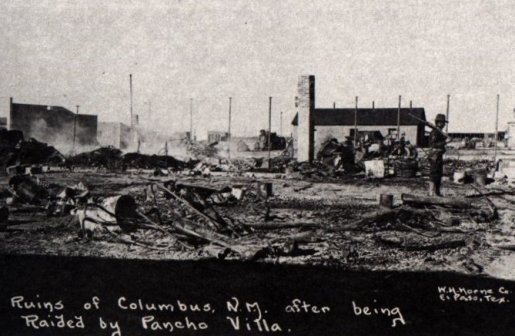
- Columbus, after the battle
Date	March 9, 1916
Location	Columbus, New Mexico, United States 31°49′51″N 107°38′30″W
Result	Villista tactical defeat: Columbus heavily damaged; Columbus was raided successfully; Villistas withdraw with heavy casualties

Belligerents
United States	Conventionists: División del Norte

Commanders and leaders
Herbert Slocum; Frank Tompkins	Pancho Villa

Strength
353	484

Casualties and losses
8 soldiers killed and 6 wounded	At least 67 killed and many more wounded 11 captured (6 executed)
- 10 civilians killed, 2 wounded

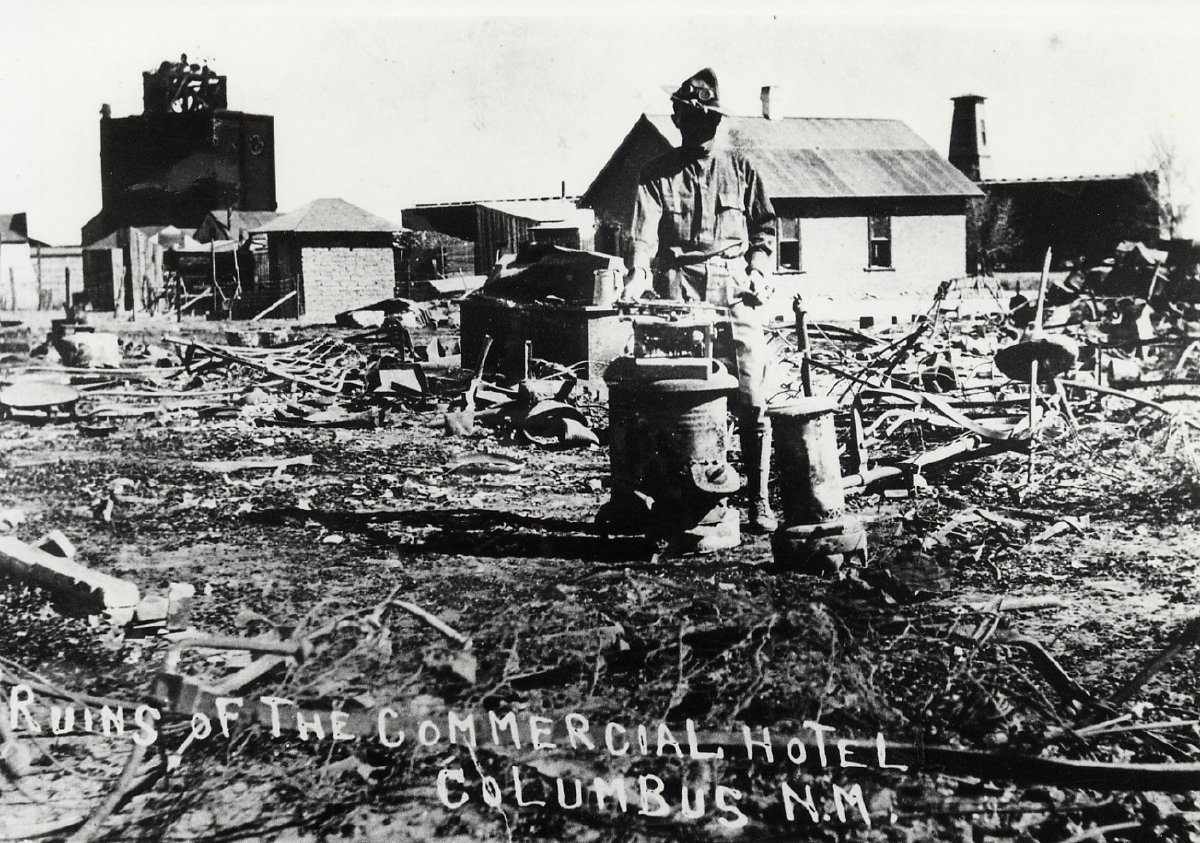
Ruins of the Commercial Hotel after the Battle of Columbus

The Battle of Columbus, also known as the Burning of Columbus or the Columbus Raid, began on March 9, 1916, as a raid conducted by remnants of Pancho Villa's Division of the North on the small United States border town of Columbus, New Mexico, located 3 miles (4.8 km) north of the border with Mexico. The raid escalated into a full-scale battle between Villistas and the United States Army.

Villa himself led the assault, only to be driven back into Mexico by elements of the 13th Cavalry Regiment stationed at the town. The attack angered Americans, and President Woodrow Wilson ordered Brigadier General John J. Pershing to lead the Punitive Expedition in which the US Army invaded Mexico but failed to capture Villa.

== Battle ==
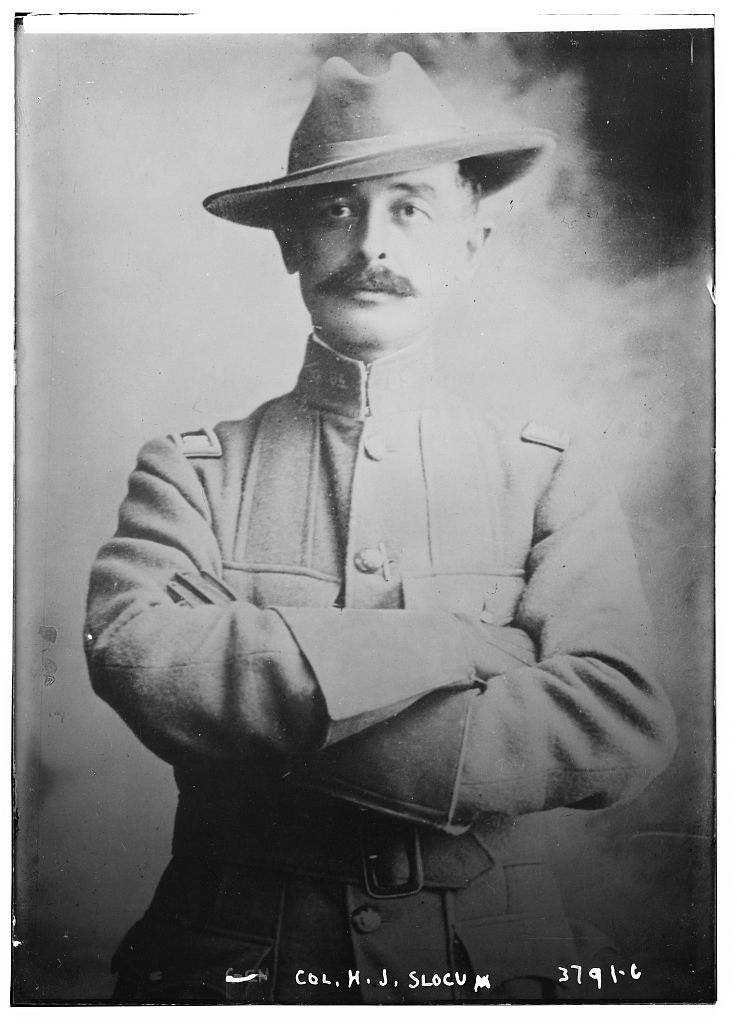
Herbert Jermain Slocum circa 1915

After the 1915 Battle of Celaya during the Mexican Revolution, where Villa sustained his greatest defeat, the Division of the North was in a disorganised condition, wandering around northern Mexico foraging for supplies. Lacking the military supplies, money, and munitions he needed to pursue his war against Mexican President Venustiano Carranza, Villa planned the raid and camped his army of an estimated 1,500 horsemen outside of Palomas on the border three miles south of Columbus, which was populated by about 300 Americans and about as many Mexicans that had fled north from the advancing Villistas. The reasons for the raid have never been established with any certainty. An American kidnap victim travelling with the raiding party, Maud Hawk Wright, said that Villa came with 1,500 men but only attacked with about 600 because there was not enough ammunition for more raiders.

At their camp, Villa sent spies into the town to assess the presence of U.S. military personnel. Upon their return, the spies told him that only about fifty soldiers were garrisoned in Columbus, a significant error. Villa then moved north and crossed the border at about midnight. The garrison came from the 13th Cavalry Regiment, usually stationed at Cavalry Camp Columbus, which was located immediately south of downtown and consisted of the headquarters troop, machine gun troop, and four of the seven rifle troops deployed to patrol the border, totaling in all 12 officers and 341 men, of which approximately 270 were combat troops. On that night, half were out of camp on patrol or other assignments

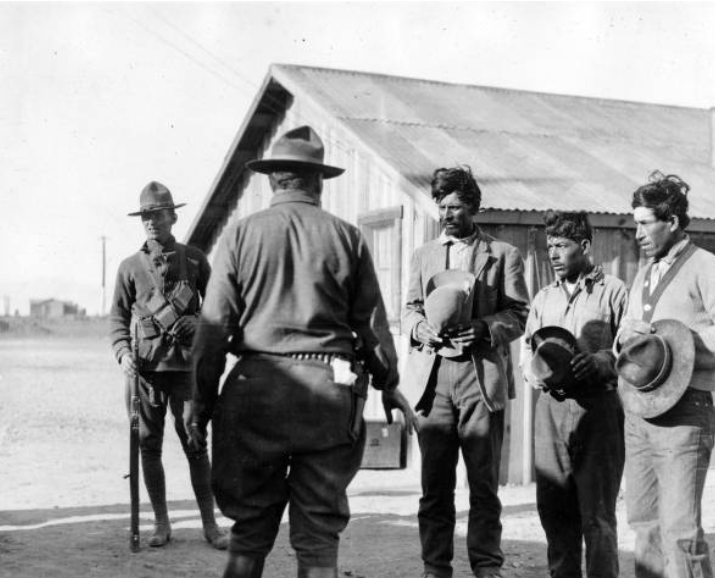
Villistas captured after the Columbus raid.

Villa divided his force into two columns, most of which approached the town on foot, and launched a two-pronged attack on the town in the dark at 4:15 am on March 9. The town's population was asleep, along with most of the garrison, when they entered Columbus from the west and southeast shouting "¡Viva Villa! ¡Viva Mexico!" and other phrases. The townspeople awoke to an army of Villistas burning their settlement and looting their homes. The commander of the 13th Cavalry was Colonel Herbert Jermain Slocum. He had been advised the day before, from three conflicting reports from Mexican sources, that Villa and his soldiers were on the move, possibly against Columbus. One warning was given by Juan Favela, the foreman of a ranch near Palomas (three miles south in Mexico), who had seen them headed north the day before the attack. Amidst many such reports that had proved false, the warning was ignored as unreliable, although the troop at the Border Gate was reinforced and all three troops in the field were ordered to step up patrolling of the 65-mile long border. However, U.S. soldiers were forbidden to reconnoiter inside Mexico and thus unable to check reports of Villa's whereabouts.

Despite being taken by surprise, the Americans quickly recovered. Soon after the attack began, 2nd Lt. John P. Lucas, commanding the 13th Cavalry's machine gun troop, made his way barefooted from his quarters to the camp's barracks. He organized a hasty defense around the camp's guard tent, where his troop's machine guns were kept under lock, with two men and a Hotchkiss M1909 Benét–Mercié machine gun. He was soon joined by the remainder of his unit and 30 troopers armed with M1903 Springfield rifles led by 2nd Lt. Horace Stringfellow, Jr. The troop's four machine guns fired more than 5,000 rounds apiece during a 90-minute fight, their targets illuminated by fires of burning buildings. In addition, many of the townspeople were armed with rifles and shotguns.

Villa's men looted and burned several houses and commercial buildings, fighting civilians that were defending their homes. It is not known if Villa was with the raiding party at any time. However, it is known that during most of the battle, Villa, his commanders, and about two dozen other men took up position on Cootes Hill overlooking Columbus where they could observe the action and where some of Villa's men acted as sharpshooters to fire upon the town. The Villistas fought the pursuing American troops and civilians until a bugler sounded the order to retreat. Major Frank Tompkins, commanding the regiment's 3rd Squadron and acting as its executive officer, asked and received permission from Slocum to pursue the withdrawing Mexicans. Disregarding the rules of engagement, he led two troops 15 miles into Mexico in pursuit of a force approximately six times the size of his, engaged Villa's rearguard four times, and inflicted some losses on them before withdrawing back across the border after running low on ammunition and water. Tompkins was awarded the Army Distinguished Service Medal and the Distinguished Service Cross in 1918 for this action. Captain A.W. Brock and his troops from Company 1 of the National Guard arrived as the sun came up. They were alerted by the 20 year old telephone switchboard operator, Susie Parks, who was trapped with her baby in the Courier Newspaper office during the battle. She was later awarded a tribute for her bravery by Mrs. L.B. Prince of Santa Fe, (wife of former territorial governor of New Mexico), and the Daughters of the American Revolution on August 27, 1916, at the Crystal Theater in Columbus.

== Aftermath ==
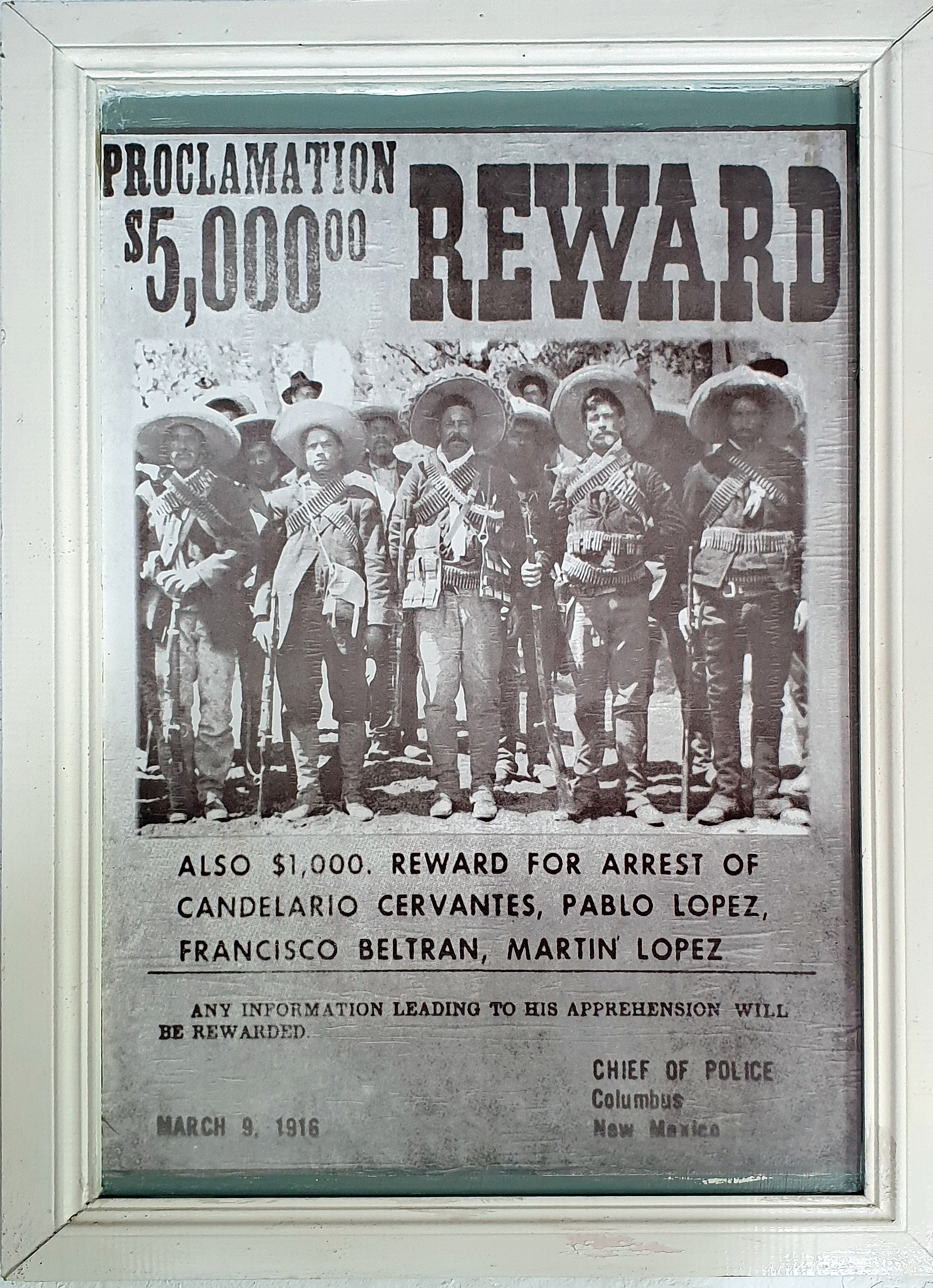
Wanted poster from the Chief of Police of Columbus, for the capture of the Mexican revolutionary officers that led the Mexican troops in the Battle of Columbus.

On March 9, 1916, after the attack, President Woodrow Wilson appointed Newton Diehl Baker, Jr. to fill the vacant position of United States Secretary of War. In spite of Villa proclaiming that the raid was a success by evidence of captured arms and equipment from the camp, which included over 300 rifles and shotguns, 80 horses, and 30 mules, the raid and subsequent withdrawal was a tactical disaster for him with ill-afforded casualties of 90 to 170 dead from an original force that had numbered 484 men, including at least 63 killed in action and at least seven more who later died from wounds during the raid itself. Eleven raiders were captured. Of those captured, seven were tried and convicted of first degree murder and sentenced to death. The sentence of Jose Rodriguez was commuted to life imprisonment by Governor William C. McDonald after McDonald accepted Rodriguez's plea that he was a Carranzista who had been forced to join Pancho Villa's ranks. The other six were executed by hanging. Two were hanged on June 9, 1916; four were hanged on June 30, 1916. The sixty-three dead Villa soldiers and all the dead Villa horses that were left behind in Columbus after the raid were dragged south of the stockyards, soaked with kerosene and burned. Various official reports state that the American dead included 8 or 10 or 11 soldiers and 7 or 8 civilians and the names on the lists are not consistent.

The United States government wasted no time in responding. National Guard units from around the United States were called up and by the end of August 1916 over 100,000 troops were on the border. The Battle of Columbus resulted in the creation of the Punitive Expedition led by General John J. Pershing to track down and capture or kill Villa or disperse the attackers. In the operation, the Army used Curtiss Jenny airplanes for reconnaissance and trucks to carry supplies (both firsts for the Army). They scoured portions of northern Mexico for six months but Villa was not found. In January 1917, with the United States likely to enter World War I soon, and under intense diplomatic pressure from the Mexican government, these troops were withdrawn from Mexico.

In commemoration of Pancho Villa's attack on Columbus, the State of New Mexico Parks Commission established Pancho Villa Historical Park and its museum in Columbus, near Cootes Hill across the Palomas road from the site of Camp Furlong. On 19 March 2024, Mexican President Andres Manuel Lopez Obrador described the attack on Columbus as "daring" and "a symbol of resistance against imperialism", adding: "We should thank Villa [for preventing] what he considered acts of treason."

== See also ==
- Capital punishment in New Mexico
- List of people executed in New Mexico
- List of people executed in the United States in 1916
- Village of Columbus and Camp Furlong, a U.S. National Historic Landmark District
- Punitive expedition
- Herbert Jermain Slocum
- Frank Tompkins
- Pancho Villa Expedition
- Susie A. Parks
- Attacks on the United States
