= Faïd =

- Village
- Interactive map of Faïd
- Coordinates: 34°43′00″N 9°30′00″E
- Country: Tunisia
- Governorate: Sidi Bouzid Governorate

Population
  - Total: 3,513
- Time zone: UTC+1

Faïd (Arabic: فائض), is a village in central Tunisia located about twenty kilometers northeast of Sidi Bouzid on the RN13 road connecting Kasserine to Sfax.

In 2004, Its population is estimated at 3,513 inhabitants.

It is also famous for producing olives, almonds, pistachios and prickly pears, as well as producing milk in abundance. It has a weekly market and that is every Friday. This market gathers all the areas surrounding the small city.

== See also ==
- List of cities in Tunisia
- Sidi Bouzid
