= Benjamín Argumedo =

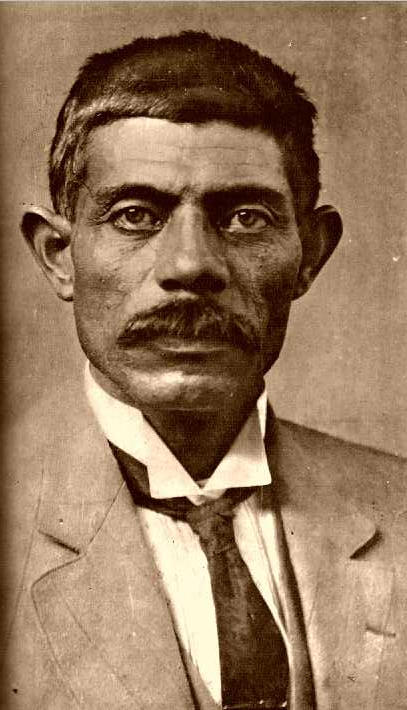
- Born: March 31, 1874; San Buenaventura, Coahuila, Mexico
- Died: March 1, 1916 (aged 41); Durango, Durango, Mexico
- Cause of death: Execution by firing squad
- Military career
- Allegiance: Porfiriato; Maderistas; Federales; Carrancistas; Orozquistas
- Branch: Mexican Army
- Service years: 1910 – 1916
- Rank: Brigadier General
- Nickname: León de la laguna
- Conflicts: Mexican Revolution: Torreón massacre; Second Battle of Torreón; Battle of Zacatecas

Benjamín Argumedo Hernández (1874–1916) was a Mexican brigadier general. He participated in the anti-reelectionist side at the beginning of the Mexican Revolution, but in 1912 he joined the opposition against Francisco I. Madero and supported the coup d'état of Victoriano Huerta. Also known as the Lion of the Lagoon. He is considered the most tenacious adversary of Francisco Villa in the bloody battles that were carried out for the lands of Durango and Coahuila, because it was said of him that he was never afraid. During the first captured of Torreon that occurred between May 13 and 15 of 1911, Argumedo gave the order to "kill all Chinese", after which they were massacred 303 residing Chinese and Japanese in the city, who were falsely accused of having shot against the Maderista hosts that Argumedo commanded together with Sixto Ugalde, Jesús Agustín Castro and Epitacio Rea, among others.

== Early years ==
Argumedo was born in San Buenaventura, Coahuila on 31 March 1874, being the third of eight children of Don Albino and Dona Argumedo Tiburcia Hernandez; He was baptized on May 8 in Matamoros, Coahuila. Initially, he was a Tailor and saddler and like many in that region, owned no land. It is not known with certainty if Benjamín Argumedo participated in pre-revolutionary activities. However, the people of Matamoros always sympathized with the ideals of Francisco I. Madero and published La Lucha, a newspaper with a Maderista affiliation. In addition, one of the places where the greatest violence was unleashed, after the crisis of 1907 was at the Hacienda de Santa Teresa, where Argumedo worked as a saddler. Argumedo likely participated in these disorders, since shortly after he would join the struggle of 1910, under the command of Sixto Ugalde, and later, of Enrique Adame Macías, with whom he took Matamoros on February 9, 1911. It is also said that Argumedo was at the head of the Gilita and Matamoros guerrillas.

== Maderista Revolution ==
In April and May, together with Adame Macías, Argumedo led the attack on Parras, where most of the population joined them, for which they had to reorganize their troops, which they divided into two groups: Argumedo commanding 300 men and was promoted to Lieutenant Colonel. He took Viesca, and later, under the command of Emilio Madero, collaborated in the capture of Torreón. In fact, when the troops were ready to attack, Argumedo started the siege unexpectedly, giving victory to the Maderista forces and demonstrating his great military capacity. Under the false excuse that a Chinese trying to defend his life fired a shot at the aggressors, Benjamín Argumedo gave the order to "kill all Chinese" (May 15, 1911); 303 Chinese citizens were massacred in what became known as the Torreón massacre.

With the triumph of Maderism, new conflicts arose in the region: Benjamín Argumedo was one of the first to declare himself against the new government. He then served at the 20th Rural Corps, under the command of Sixto Ugalde and he was dissatisfied that his merits were not important enough to give him command of his own rural corps. At the beginning of 1912, several groups of agricultural workers revealed themselves under the orders of Argumedo, Pablo Lavín and José de Jesús Campos under the forces of Pascual Orozco. They had no clear objective, but their ranks were swelled by rising unemployment in the region. In mid-February, Argumedo besieged San Pedro de las Colonias with 600 men. They were repelled and headed south to take Matamoros Laguna; later he went to the south of Torreón, already in command of 1000 men. His first actions as an orozquista were the taking of Mapimí, on March 15, and the unsuccessful attack on Pedriceña, together with Emilio P. Campa . A month later, Argumedo finally took Pedriceña, Durango, with 3,000 men; later Torreón threatened. At the end of May, Pascual Orozco was defeated by General Victoriano Huerta and Argumedo was defeated in mid-June by General Aureliano Blanquet. Already with few men, Argumedo began to operate on the border of Zacatecas and Durango; later he was joined by other rebel chiefs, thus forming a considerable column. At the end of July, they went to the southwest of Chihuahua, and later returned to Durango with a much smaller contingent, it was then that they began to prey on farms and assassinate local Maderista authorities and continued with this pattern until the fall of Francisco I. Madero.

== Huertismo ==
When Victoriano Huerta took power, his situation changed from a bandit to a man of order. In the first days of February 1913 Argumedo was prowling in Zacatecas and San Luis Potosí; where he was defeated at the Hacienda de Santo Domingo on February 10. This was his last battle as a rebel, since he recognized the Huertista government in March; he was appointed Brigadier General of the Federal Army. Argumedo's task was not easy: he had to face the Constitutionalists, who in the region were under the command of Pancho Villa and Tomás Urbina. He was first sent to San Luis Potosí, as they feared that their troops would go over to constitutionalism, but he was soon called to operate in the Torreón area; Argumedo demonstrated authority; the best example was his defense of Torreón, on July 13, 1913, where with a small group of men he defeated almost all the rebel leaders of La Laguna. However, at the beginning of 1914, the constitutionalists, under the command of Pancho Villa, recovered the City of Torreón; defeating the federalistas of Argumedo and José Refugio Velasco. These had to retreat to the south. Later Pancho Villa returned to defeat Argumedo and the Federal Army in the famous Battle of Zacatecas, at the end of June 1914. With the victory of the Constitutionalists over the Victoriano Huerta regime, Argumedo began another phase of his revolutionary struggle.

== Rebel and death ==
He refused to accept the Teoloyucan Treaties and rose up against the government of Venustiano Carranza, becoming a rebel again. His operations began operating on the border of Puebla and Morelos, sometimes alongside Juan Andrew Almazán and Higinio Aguilar, on others alongside Emiliano Zapata. Soon he was defeated in Puebla, where he was wounded, then he was sent to defend Tezontepec and continued to participate in other military activities, where he was constantly defeated. In mid-April, he was tasked with obstructing Álvaro Obregón's supply lines for his campaign in the Bajío, in which he was not successful either and in June, Pachuca was being threatened to be under siege. However, there was information that on the same days he was with 3000 men defending Mexico City. Due to friction with Higinio Aguilar and with the Zapatista troops, Argumedo was forced to leave the center of the country. Due to this, he convinced the conventionist President Francisco Lagos Cházaro to change the seat of government from Toluca to Durango, however, halfway there, Lagos Cházaro changed course towards Tamaulipas, and Argumedo, without any government to defend, went to Durango, where he arrived in early December 1915. At the end of January 1916, the forces of Domingo Arrieta and Fortunato Maycotte defeated Argumedo, who was seriously wounded. Argumedo hid in the Sierra de los Reyes, but General Francisco Murguía apprehended him on February 4 at Rancho El Paraíso. He was sent to Durango, where an extraordinary court martial sentenced him to death. He was shot on March 1, 1916.

== In popular culture ==
The film Persecución y muerte de Benjamín Argumedo was filmed in Mexico in 1980, directed by Mario Hernández with Antonio Aguilar in the main role. The film has a version of the corrido by Benjamín Argumedo, 3 whose original version 4 was recorded for the first time by Andrés Berlanga and Francisco Montalvo in 1935.

During the celebrations of the Bicentennial of the Independence of Mexico, a 20-meter, 7-ton polyurethane monument called 'El Coloso' was erected in the Zócalo of the Federal District . 5

In an interview with Mexican media such as XEW-AM and Once TV, the creator of El Coloso, Juan Canfield, expressly said that he was based on Argumedo's traits: "He was not selected for his participation in the Revolution (...) but rather because of his physical appearance. A very strong man, with a character, with such super revolutionary mustaches, "Canfield told Once TV. 7 That the 'Coloso' was based on Argumedo's face was also confirmed in a note from Milenio Televisión.

However, the Ministry of Public Education issued a press release, dated September 20, 2010, stating that "The face of the Colossus does not portray any particular character and does not have a specific identity. It has no name or surname." These statements created controversy among the public and the Mexican media.
