= Aureliano Blanquet =

Mexican army general (1848–1919)

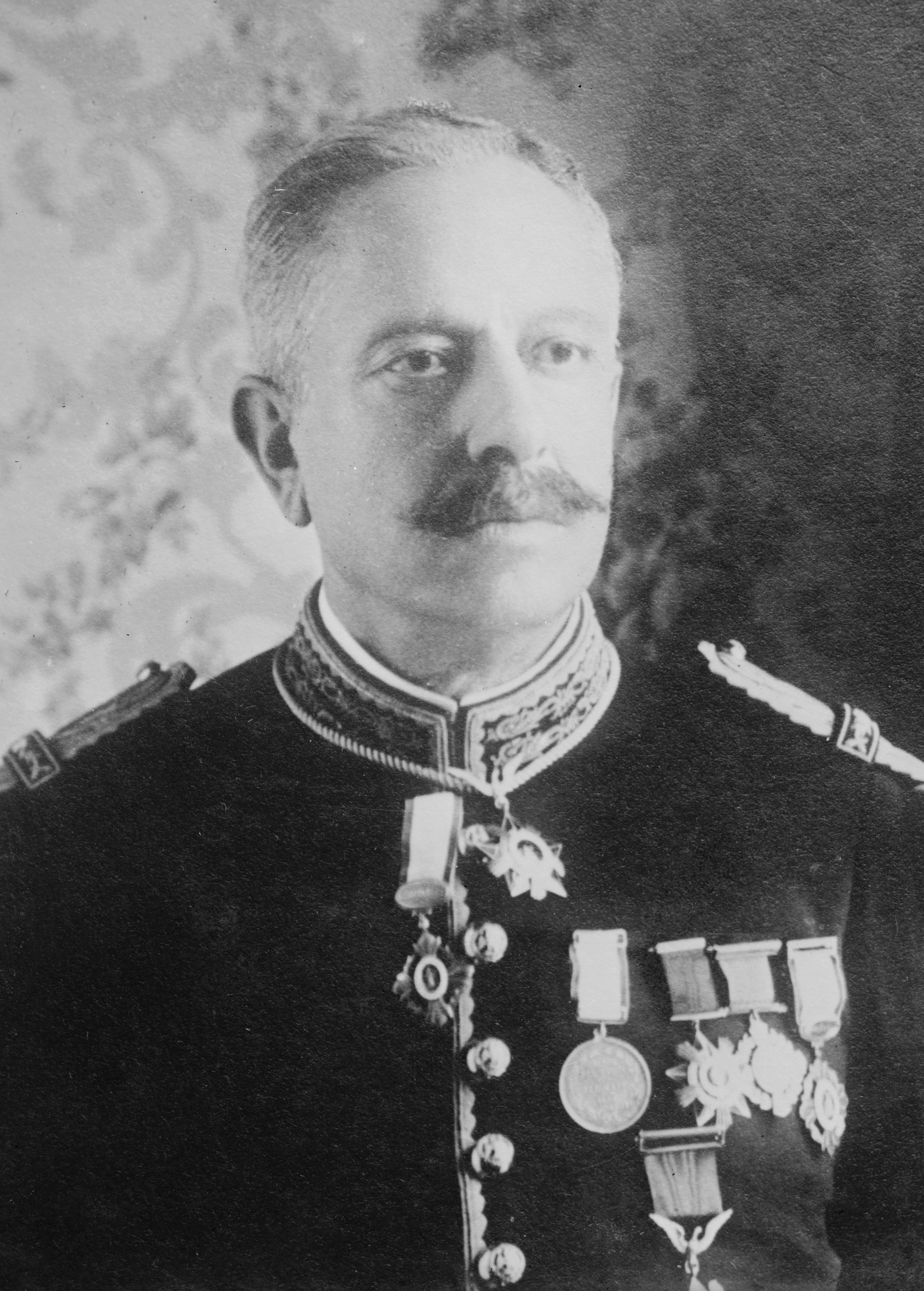
- Blanquet in 1913

Secretary of War and Navy
- In office 13 June 1913 – 1 July 1914
- President: Victoriano Huerta
- Preceded by: Manuel Mondragón
- Succeeded by: José Refugio Velasco

Personal details
- Born: December 31, 1848 Morelia, Michoacán, Mexico
- Died: April 16, 1919 (aged 69) Huatusco, Veracruz, Mexico
- Spouse: María de Jesús Olivo (m. 1876)
- Children: 2
- Education: San Nicolás University

Military service
- Rank: General
- Commands: Federal Army
- Battles/wars: Second French intervention in Mexico; Siege of Querétaro; Garza Revolution; Caste War of Yucatán; Mexican Revolution; Ten Tragic Days

Aureliano Blanquet Torres (31 December 1848 – 16 April 1919) was a Mexican general who served as secretary of war and navy from 1913 to 1914 during the presidency of Victoriano Huerta. Blanquet served in the Federal Army during the Mexican Revolution and was a key participant in the coup d'état during the Ten Tragic Days.

Blanquet was born in Morelia, Michoacán, and joined the Republican forces during the second French intervention in Mexico. During the Porfiriato, Blanquet rose through the ranks of the Federal Army, participating in the suppression of uprisings including the Garza Revolution and the Caste War of Yucatán. During the latter conflict, he became an ally of fellow general Victoriano Huerta. At the outbreak of the Mexican Revolution, Blanquet remained loyal to President Porfirio Díaz, and following the victory of revolutionary Francisco I. Madero in 1911, he retained his post. In 1913, Huerta and Blanquet led a coup against Madero known as the Ten Tragic Days, with Huerta becoming president and Blanquet secretary of war and the navy. He held the role until he went into exile in 1914.

He returned to Mexico in 1919 to support an uprising by Félix Díaz, but was killed and decapitated in Veracruz while retreating. In the historiography of Mexico, Blanquet is remembered as a traitor due to his role in the overthrow of Madero and is considered to be one of the primary villains of the revolution.

== Early life ==
=== Personal life ===
Aureliano Blanquet Torres (Note: Some sources give Blanquet's first name as Aurelio.) was born on 31 December 1848 in Morelia, in the state of Michoacán. He was the son of Antonio D. Blanquet and María Torres. Blanquet's father provided him with education for a career in commerce, but when Blanquet was twelve, his father died. Afterwards, his mother sent him to the Colegio San Nicolás in Morelia. He did not receive a degree, as three years into his studies he joined the army. On 10 September 1876, Blanquet married María de Jesús Olivo, who came from a prominent Morelia family. Their son, also named Aureliano, served as an alternate federal deputy for Hidalgo from 1914 to 1915. They also had a daughter, Esperanza.

=== Early military career ===
In 1863, during the second French intervention in Mexico, Blanquet joined the Republican forces as a private. By 1866, he had become a second sergeant. Later, as a brigadier sergeant, he participated in the siege of Querétaro, which resulted in the capture of Maximilian von Habsburg. Afterwards, Maximilian was under Blanquet's custody. On 19 July 1867, Blanquet was a member of the firing squad which executed Maximilian, as well as former president Miguel Miramón and General Tomás Mejía. Reportedly, Blanquet may have been the one who gave Maximilian the coup de grâce by shooting him in the heart.

On 4 February 1877, Blanquet enlisted in the regular Federal Army as a second lieutenant. Under Porfirio Díaz he made steady but unspectacular advancement.

In 1891, Blanquet became a second captain. The same year, he fought against an uprising led by Catarino Garza. In the late 1890s he was involved in putting down uprisings by indigenous Maya people in Yucatán. In the early 1900s in Yucatán, he met fellow officer Victoriano Huerta. In 1898, Blanquet was promoted to the rank of first captain.

== Mexican Revolution ==
In July 1911 Blanquet commanded federal troops stationed in Puebla. On July 12 a group of armed men fired shots at the rival Maderistas and fled into the federal army barracks. The incident erupted into an all-out battle in which Blanquet defeated the Maderistas. 46 were killed, including women and children. On the next day Madero publicly hugged Blanquet and cleared him of any wrongdoing; he ordered radical Maderistas to surrender arms to Blanquet's Federales and go home. The Puebla Incident also created international tension after the fleeing Maderistas killed German and Spanish expatriates who stood in their way.

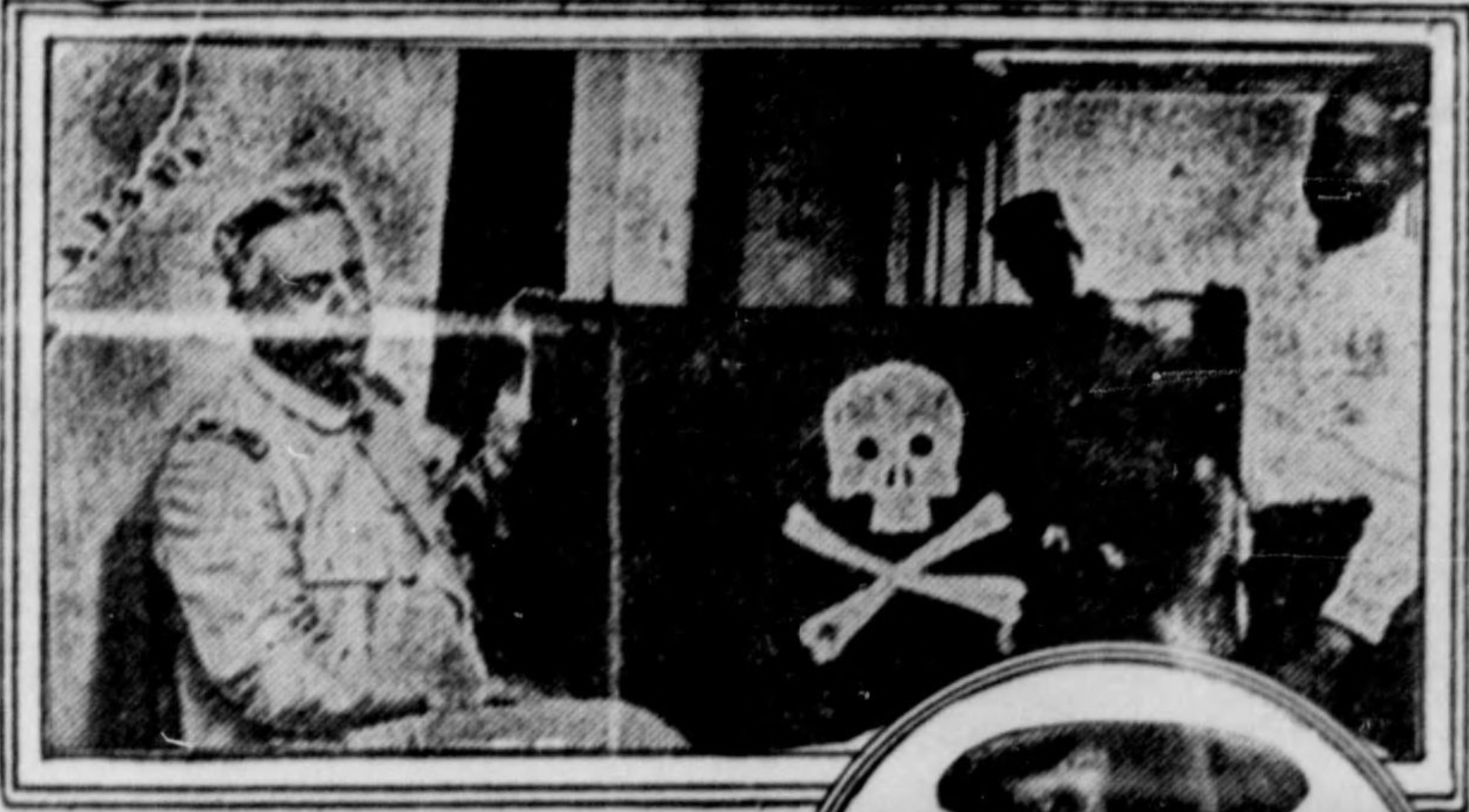
Blanquet with his personal battle flag, 1913

During May 1912 Blanquet served under General Victoriano Huerta, leading the 29th Infantry Battalion in the successful suppression of the Pascual Orozco revolt against the Madero government. In June, Blanquet fought the Orozquista general Benjamín Argumedo in Nazas, Durango.

=== Ten Tragic Days ===
The Ten Tragic Days (Spanish: Decena Trágica) was a coup d'état against President Madero that began on 9 February 1913. Insurgent generals Félix Díaz and Manuel Mondragón unsuccessfully tried to take the National Palace, the president's residence, and subsequently took up refuge in the Ciudadela, Mexico City's main garrison. Despite formally fighting them, General Huerta had secretly negotiated with Díaz and U.S. Ambassador Henry Lane Wilson to overthrow Madero. Blanquet was a key participant in this conspiracy.

On 17 February, Blanquet and his 29th Battalion reunited with Huerta, and Blanquet ordered his troops to relieve the National Palace guard of their duties. On 18 February at 1:30 in the afternoon, Madero and his cabinet were interrupted by members of the 29th Battalion, which resulted in a shootout. Madero, Vice President José María Pino Suárez and the surviving cabinet members ran into the palace courtyard, encountering Blanquet. The general pointed his pistol at Madero and told him, "You are my prisoner." Madero shouted, "You are a traitor!", to which Blanquet responded calmly, "Yes, I am a traitor." On 19 February, Madero and Pino Suárez gave their resignations, and Huerta assumed the presidency on a provisional basis.

=== Huerta government and exile ===
Mondragón became the Secretary of War and the Navy in Huerta's government, but following the sidelining of Félix Díaz, Mondragón resigned and left the country, and Huerta replaced him with Blanquet. He assumed office on 13 June 1913. He held the post until 1 July 1914. He was succeeded by José Refugio Velasco.

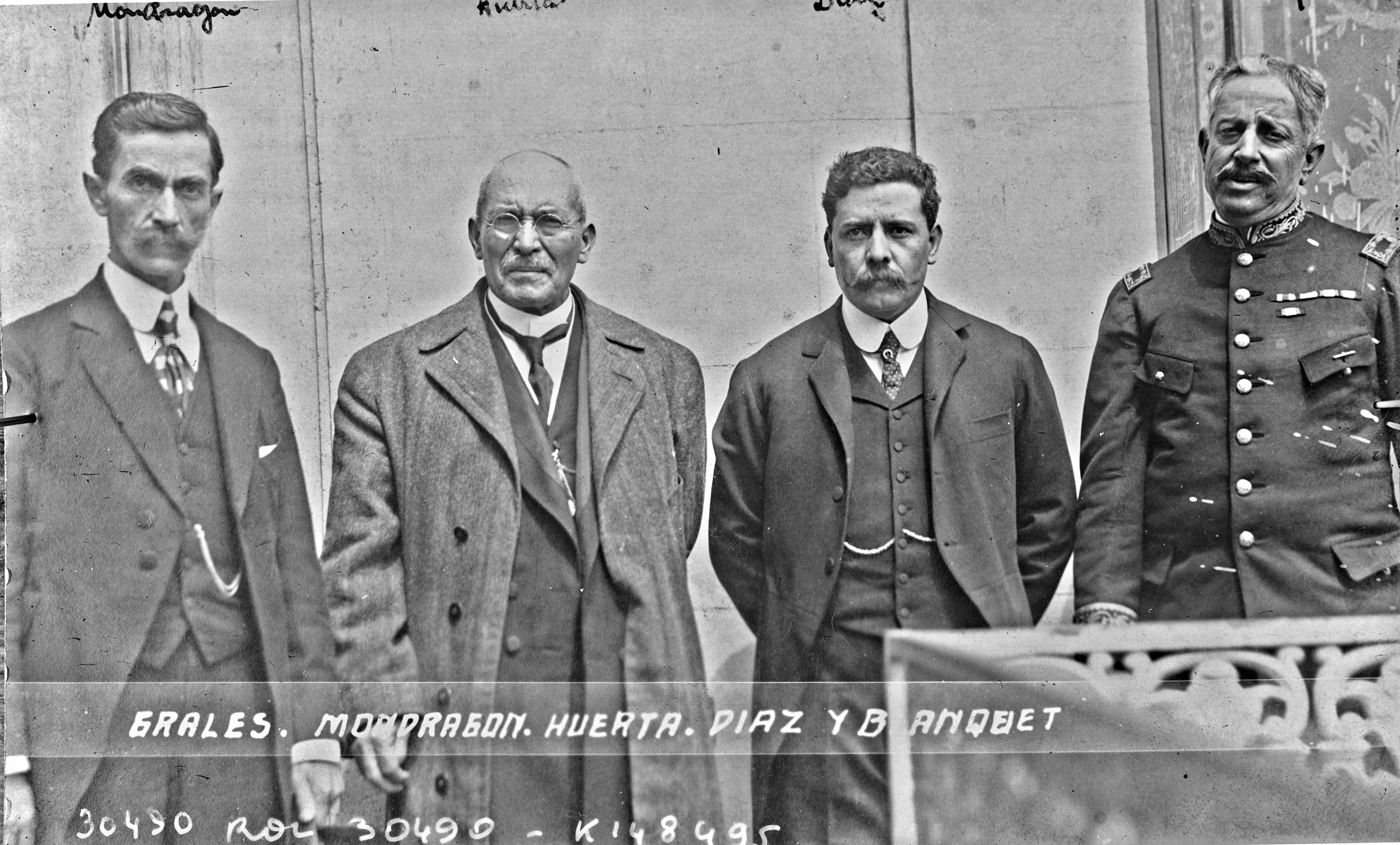
Generals Manuel Mondragón, Victoriano Huerta, Félix Díaz, and Blanquet in 1913

In October 1913 Huerta dissolved the Federal Congress and prepared for a rigged referendum to legitimize himself as the President, with Blanquet named as vice-president.

In July 1914, when the Huerta government collapsed, Blanquet resigned as vice president, and departed from Mexico with Huerta.

On August 19, 1914, General Blanquet, having returned from overseas, intervened in the disbandment process of Huerta's defeated Federal army. He led the 29th Battalion of 400 men, which he had formerly commanded, plus other remnants of Federal troops dissatisfied with their redundancy payments, against Carrancistas in Puebla. Blanquet captured the city and learned that two Carrancistas agents, brothers Ramon and Raphael Cabrera, were on their way to Puebla to assert the authority of the new government. Blanquet's federals captured the Cabreras and shot them on Blanquet's order. The two surviving Cabrera brothers, Luiz and Alfonso, avenged the dead with a campaign of terror, killing over sixty Federal prisoners. Blanquet escaped and resumed his exile, in Cuba.

=== Death ===
On 3 April 1919, Blanquet returned from exile in Cuba, disembarking at the port of Veracruz, to support the Félix Díaz rebellion against Venustiano Carranza. With only about six followers he moved inland from the Gulf Coast in an attempt to join up with Díaz. On April 16, 1919, Blanquet was killed when his horse fell down a ravine after a skirmish with government troops near La Barranca de Chavaxtla, in Huatusco, Veracruz. The Constitutionalist commander General Guadalupe Sánchez had Blanquet's head taken to Veracruz for display and photographing.

== Legacy ==
Due to his role in the Ten Tragic Days, Blanquet became known as a traitor in Mexico. The historian Peter Henderson has identified Blanquet as "one of the major villains of the Mexican Revolution". Blanquet, along with other figures from the revolution, has also been featured in corridos, with the song "Tragedia compuesta a la revolución Maderista y a Torreón" comparing Blanquet to Saint Augustine.

== Bibliography ==
- Aguilar Casas, Elsa; Serrano Álvarez, Pablo (2012). Martínez Ocampo, Lourdes (ed.). Posrevolución y estabilidad. Cronología (1917-1967) (PDF) (in Spanish). Instituto Nacional de Estudios Históricos de las Revoluciones de México. ISBN 978-607-7916-65-9. Archived (PDF) from the original on 29 September 2025.
- Brill, Mark (18 February 2026). "The Corrido of the Mexican Revolution as war propaganda". Early Popular Visual Culture. 23 (4). Routledge: 391–416. doi:10.1080/17460654.2026.2626056.
- Camp, Roderic Ai (1991). Mexican Political Biographies, 1884-1934. Austin: University of Texas Press. ISBN 978-029-2756-03-8. JSTOR 10.7560/751194.
- Díaz Zermeño, Héctor (2004). ¿Cancerbero del traidor Victoriano Huerta o militar leal? Aureliano Blanquet (1848-1919) (in Spanish). National Autonomous University of Mexico. ISBN 970-32-2219-6.
- Eisenhower, John S.D. (1993). Intervention! The United States and the Mexican Revolution, 1913-1917. New York City: W. W. Norton & Company. ISBN 978-0-393-31318-5.
- Galeana, Patricia, ed. (2013). Generales de la revolucón, tomo I: A-L (PDF) (in Spanish). Instituto Nacional de Estudios Históricos de las Revoluciones de México. ISBN 978-607-9276-48-5. Archived (PDF) from the original on 10 July 2025.
- Henderson, Peter (2000). In the absence of Don Porfirio: Francisco León de la Barra and the Mexican Revolution. Rowman & Littlefield. ISBN 0-8420-2774-2.
- Krauze, Enrique (1998) [1997]. Mexico: Biography of Power, A History of Modern Mexico, 1810-1996. Translated by Heifetz, Hank. Harper Perennial. ISBN 978-0-06-092917-6.
- LaFrance, David (2007). Revolution in Mexico's Heartland: Politics, War, and State Building in Puebla, 1913-1920. Rowman & Littlefield. ISBN 0-7425-5600-X.
- Rausch Jr., George J. (October 1964). "The Early Career of Victoriano Huerta". The Americas. 21 (2): 136–145. JSTOR 979057.
- Serrano Álvarez, Pablo (2011). Cronología de la Revolución (1906-1917) (PDF) (in Spanish). Instituto Nacional de Estudios Históricos de las Revoluciones de México. ISBN 978-607-7916-11-6. Archived (PDF) from the original on 7 August 2025.
- Quijano Torres, Manuel (2012). "Relación de gabinetes, 1821-2012". 200 Años de Administración Pública en México, Tomo III: Los Gabinetes en México, 1824-2012 (PDF) (in Spanish). Instituto Nacional de Administración Pública. pp. 98–364. ISBN 978-607-9026-20-2. Archived (PDF) from the original on 4 July 2024.
- Villalpando, José Manuel; Rosas, Alejandro (2009) [2003]. Historia de México a través de sus gobernantes (PDF) (in Spanish). Planeta. ISBN 978-970-37-0770-6. Archived (PDF) from the original on 13 June 2024.
