= Secretary of War and Navy (Mexico) =

- Secretario de Guerra y Marina
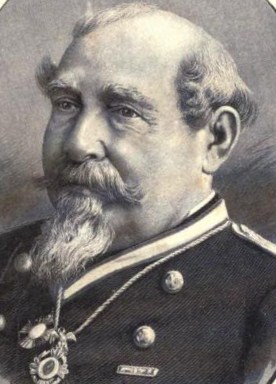
- Longest serving Pedro Hinojosa; 1 December 1884 – 20 March 1896
- Secretariat of War and Navy
- Member of: Cabinet of Mexico
- Reports to: President of Mexico
- Seat: Mexico City
- Appointer: President of Mexico
- Formation: 1884
- First holder: Pedro Hinojosa
- Final holder: Pablo Quiroga Escamilla
- Abolished: 1934
- Superseded by: Secretary of National Defense; Secretary of the Navy

The Secretary of War and Navy (Spanish: Secretario de Guerra y Marina) was a member of the federal executive cabinet as well as a high-ranking officer with the responsibility of commanding the Mexican Army and Mexican Navy (including the Naval Infantry Corps). The secretary is appointed by the President of the Republic.

== List of officeholders ==
Secretary	Term	President(s)	Presidential term
Pedro Hinojosa	1884-1896	Porfirio Díaz	1884-1911
Felipe Berriozábal	1896-1900	Porfirio Díaz	1884-1911
Bernardo Reyes	1900-1902	Porfirio Díaz	1884-1911
Francisco Z. Mena	1903-1905	Porfirio Díaz	1884-1911
Manuel González de Cosío	1905-1911	Porfirio Díaz	1884-1911
Eugenio Rascón	1911	Francisco León de la Barra	1911
José González Salas	1911	Francisco León de la Barra	1911
José González Salas	1911-1912	Francisco I. Madero	1911-1913
Ángel García Peña	1912-1913	Francisco I. Madero	1911-1913
Manuel Mondragón	1913	Victoriano Huerta	1913-1914
Aureliano Blanquet	1913-1914	Victoriano Huerta	1913-1914
José Refugio Velasco	1914	Victoriano Huerta	1913-1914
José Refugio Velasco	1914	Francisco Carvajal	1914
José Isabel Robles	1914-1915	Eulalio Gutiérrez Ortiz	1914-1915
Alfredo Serratos	1915	Roque González Garza	1915
Francisco V. Pacheco	1915	Roque González Garza	1915
Eduardo Hay	1914	Venustiano Carranza	1917-1920
Jacinto B. Treviño	1914	Venustiano Carranza	1917-1920
Ignacio L. Pesqueira	1914-1916	Venustiano Carranza	1917-1920
Álvaro Obregón	1916-1917	Venustiano Carranza	1917-1920
Jesús Agustín Castro	1917-1918	Venustiano Carranza	1917-1920
Juan José Ríos	1918-1920	Venustiano Carranza	1917-1920
Francisco L. Urquizo	1920	Venustiano Carranza	1917-1920
Plutarco Elías Calles	1920	Adolfo de la Huerta	1920
Benjamín Hill	1920	Álvaro Obregón	1920-1924
Enrique Estrada	1920-1922	Álvaro Obregón	1920-1924
Francisco R. Serrano	1922-1924	Álvaro Obregón	1920-1924
Joaquín Amaro	1924-1928	Plutarco Elías Calles	1924-1928
Joaquín Amaro	1928-1930	Emilio Portes Gil	1928-1930
Joaquín Amaro	1930-1931	Pascual Ortiz Rubio	1930-1932
Plutarco Elías Calles	1931-1932	Pascual Ortiz Rubio	1930-1932
Abelardo L. Rodríguez	1932	Pascual Ortiz Rubio	1930-1932
Pablo Quiroga Escamilla	1932-1933	Abelardo L. Rodríguez	1932-1934
Lázaro Cárdenas del Río	1933	Abelardo L. Rodríguez	1932-1934
Pablo Quiroga Escamilla	1933-1934	Abelardo L. Rodríguez	1932-1934
Pablo Quiroga Escamilla	1934-1935	Lázaro Cárdenas del Río	1934-1940
Andrés Figueroa Figueroa	1935-1936	Lázaro Cárdenas del Río	1934-1940

== See also ==
- Secretariat of National Defense (Mexico)
- Secretariat of the Navy
