= Felipe Ángeles =

Mexican general and revolutionary

Felipe Ángeles General de División del Ejército Mexicano
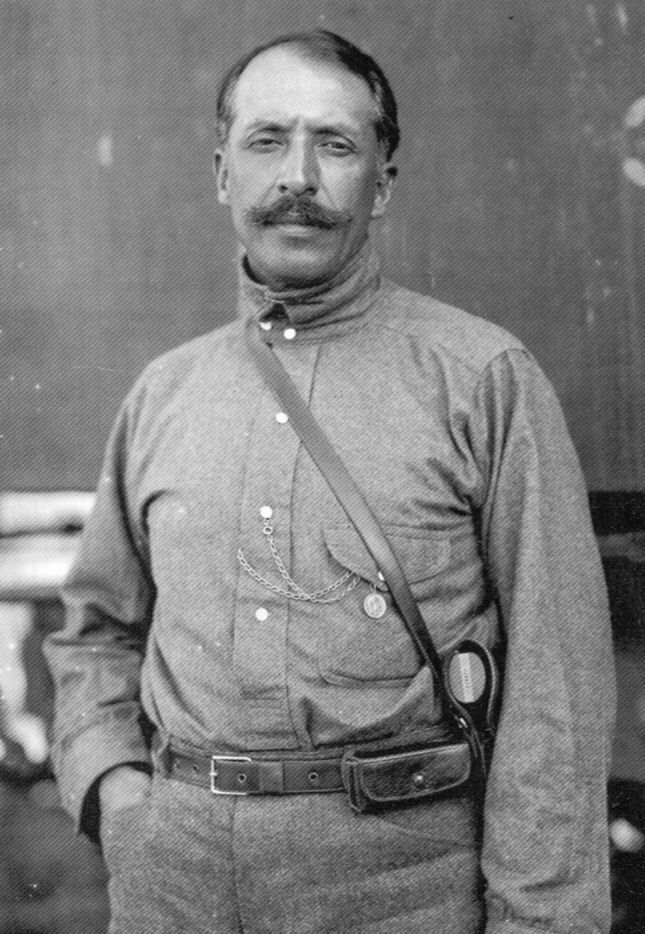
- Ángeles c.1917

Governor and Military Commander of Nuevo León
- In office 15 January 1915 – 15 February 1915
- Preceded by: José Videgaray
- Succeeded by: Raúl Madero

Governor of Coahuila
- In office 6 January 1915 – 12 January 1915
- Preceded by: Jesús Acuña
- Succeeded by: Santiago Ramírez

Commandant of the Heroic Military Academy
- In office 8 January 1912 – 18 February 1913
- Preceded by: Joaquín Beltrán Castañares
- Succeeded by: Miguel Bernard

Personal details
- Born: 13 June 1868 Zacualtipán, Hidalgo, Mexico
- Died: 26 November 1919 (aged 51) Chihuahua City, Chihuahua, Mexico
- Cause of death: Execution by firing squad
- Spouse: Clara Krause (m. 1896)
- Education: Heroic Military Academy
- Occupation: Military officer

Military service
- Allegiance: Mexico
- Branch/service: Mexican Army; División del Norte
- Years of service: 1892–1919
- Rank: General
- Battles/wars: Mexican Revolution; Ten Tragic Days; First Battle of Torreón; Second Battle of Ciudad Juárez; Battle of Ojinaga; Second Battle of Torreón; Battle of San Pedro de las Colonias; Battle of Paredón; Battle of Zacatecas; Battle of Ramos Arizpe; Battle of Celaya; Battle of León

Felipe Ángeles Ramírez (1868–1919) was a Mexican military officer and revolutionary during the era of the Mexican Revolution. Having risen to the rank of colonel of artillery in the Federal Army of the Porfiriato, Ángeles was promoted to general during the brief presidency of Francisco I. Madero. After the Ten Tragic Days, he became unique in the history of the revolution by becoming the only Federal general to join the revolutionary cause in northern Mexico, serving with General Pancho Villa's División del Norte.

== Early life ==
Felipe Ángeles was born on June 13, 1868, in Zacualtipán, Hidalgo, the son of Felipe Ángeles and Juana Ramírez. The elder Felipe Ángeles was a small farmer who had participated in the war with the United States in 1847 and in the war to remove Emperor Maximilian in 1862.

== Education and early military career ==
Ángeles was educated at the primary level in Molango, Hidalgo. He went on to study in the Instituto Literario in Pachuca, subsequently entering the Military Academy in Mexico City in 1883 at the age of 14. He obtained the rank of lieutenant of engineers in 1892. Concentrating on raising the professional level of the officers of the Federal Army through improved education, he took on various lectureships in the military academy. In 1896 he was promoted to captain of artillery, and by 1901 he had obtained the rank of major. Three years later he was promoted to the rank of lieutenant colonel and to full colonel in 1908. That same year, he left for France to study contemporary artillery.

While Ángeles was teaching at the Military Academy he met and courted Clara Krause (1876–1919), a California woman of German ancestry who was teaching school in Mexico City. They were married in November 1896.

Colonel Ángeles was in Paris as when the Mexican Revolution broke out in late 1910. His request to return to Mexico was rejected, and consequently he did not participate in the Madero revolution. As (Mexico's) Inspector General of Munitions at the Sharpshooting Academy at Mailly, Ángeles perfected the "French 75," which would become one of the more effective weapons in the Great War. In May 1911, he was awarded the order of Knight of the Legion of Honor by the French government.

== Revolutionary activities ==
Colonel Ángeles returned to Mexico in January 1912. Shortly thereafter, he met with new President Francisco I. Madero, and Madero appointed Ángeles director of the Military Academy at Chapultepec. While he was director, he had much contact with President Madero, and developed a reputation as a cultured dignified officer and a man of honor. In June 1912, he was promoted to brigadier general.

The Madero government was under attack from many sides, and in August 1912, President Madero sent General Ángeles to Morelos to take charge of the seventh military zone, and battle the Emiliano Zapata insurgency. Ángeles, with Madero's concurrence, changed the harsh military tactics and offered amnesty to those revolutionaries who agreed to lay down their arms. Ángeles unleashed aerial bombardment and modern counter-insurgency warfare against those who refused to surrender, but he did not deliberately target civilians. While this did not end the rebellion, it did much to reduce the level of violence.

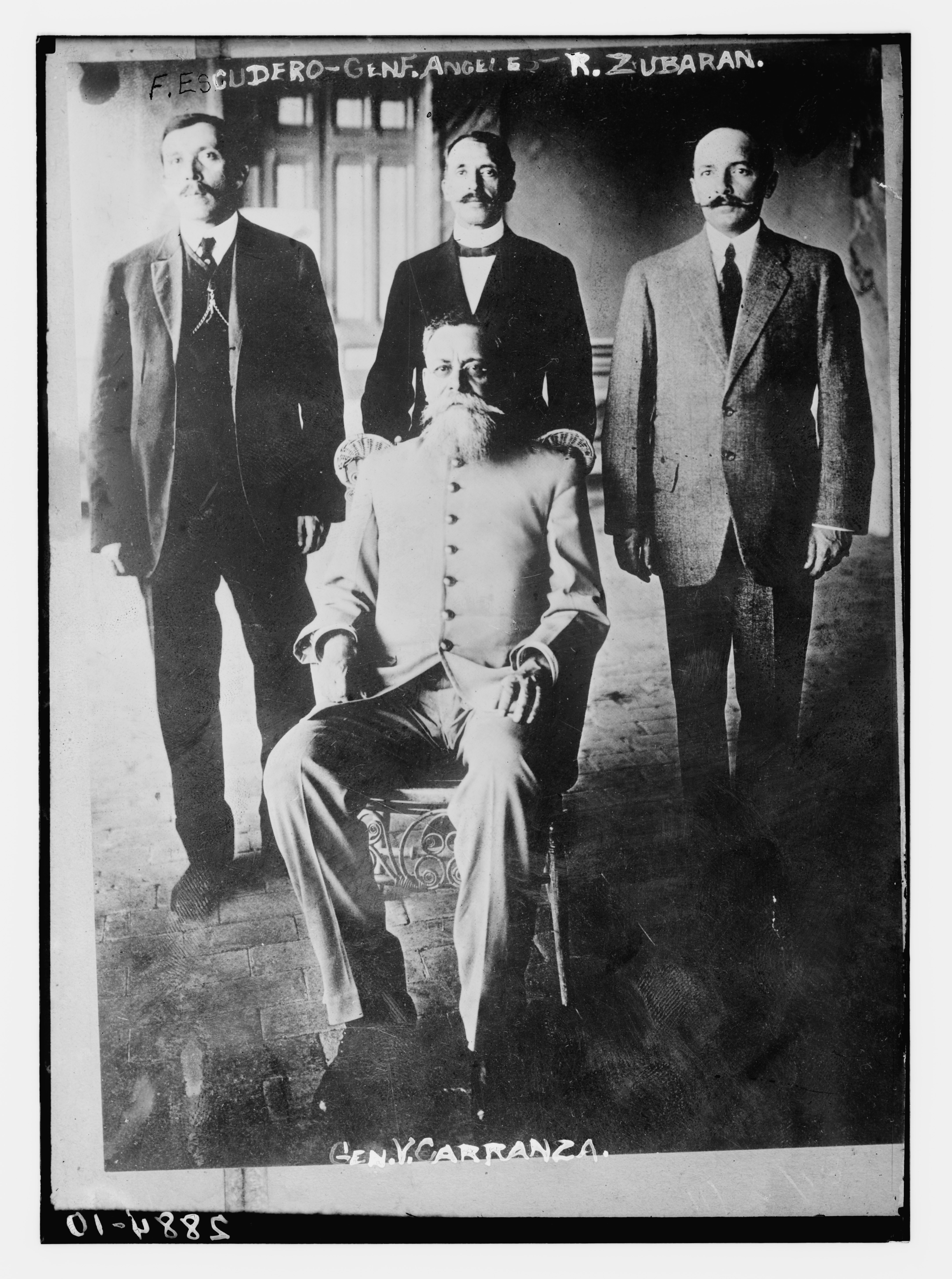
Leader of the Constitutionalists Venustiano Carranza poses with his supporters, 1913. Felipe Ángeles stands directly behind him.

In February 1913, a reactionary coup d'état known as La decena trágica ended the Madero government when a conservative military faction attacked the National Palace. The attack was turned back, and the conspirators barricaded themselves within the armory. President Madero appointed General Victoriano Huerta to lead the loyal troops, and then traveled to Morelos to confer with Ángeles. Madero and Ángeles returned to Mexico City, with the understanding that Ángeles would be placed in charge of the forces loyal to Madero. However, the Army staff objected, stating that under army regulations, Ángeles was technically not yet a general, as Congress had not confirmed his appointment. After ten days of fighting, General Huerta, aided by U.S. Ambassador Henry Lane Wilson, reached an accommodation with the rebels. Huerta, supported by the conservative rebel units, arrested President Madero, Vice-president Pino Suarez, and General Ángeles. The president and the vice-president were subsequently assassinated. Ángeles was arrested with Madero and Pino Suarez. Huerta subjected Ángeles to a sham trial, accusing him of murdering a child during the barrage of La Ciudadela. Ángeles defended himself ably, and Huerta sent him into exile in France rather than in front of a firing squad.

== Return to Mexico ==
While in Paris, General Ángeles made contact with individuals opposed to the new Huerta government. He was persuaded to return to Mexico in October 1913, and join the anti-Huerta forces under Venustiano Carranza in Sonora. Carranza confirmed Ángeles' rank of brigadier general and appointed him Secretary of War in the Revolutionary Government. However, the powerful Sonoran faction considered Ángeles to be a holdover of the old Díaz regime, and treated him with suspicion and hostility. To placate the Sonorans, Carranza downgraded Ángeles's position to sub-Secretary of War. While in this position, Ángeles formulated the rebel grand strategy of a three-prong attack south to Mexico City: General Álvaro Obregón to advance south along the western railroad, General Pancho Villa to advance south along the central railroad, and General Pablo González to advance south along the eastern railroad.

In January 1914, Ángeles accompanied Carranza on a visit to Chihuahua to confer with Pancho Villa. Ángeles, unhappy under Carranza, convinced Villa to ask Carranza to put him in charge of his artillery. Villa asked for Ángeles' services, and Carranza willingly released him. He consequently joined Pancho Villa's Division of the North in March 1914.

== Service with Villa ==
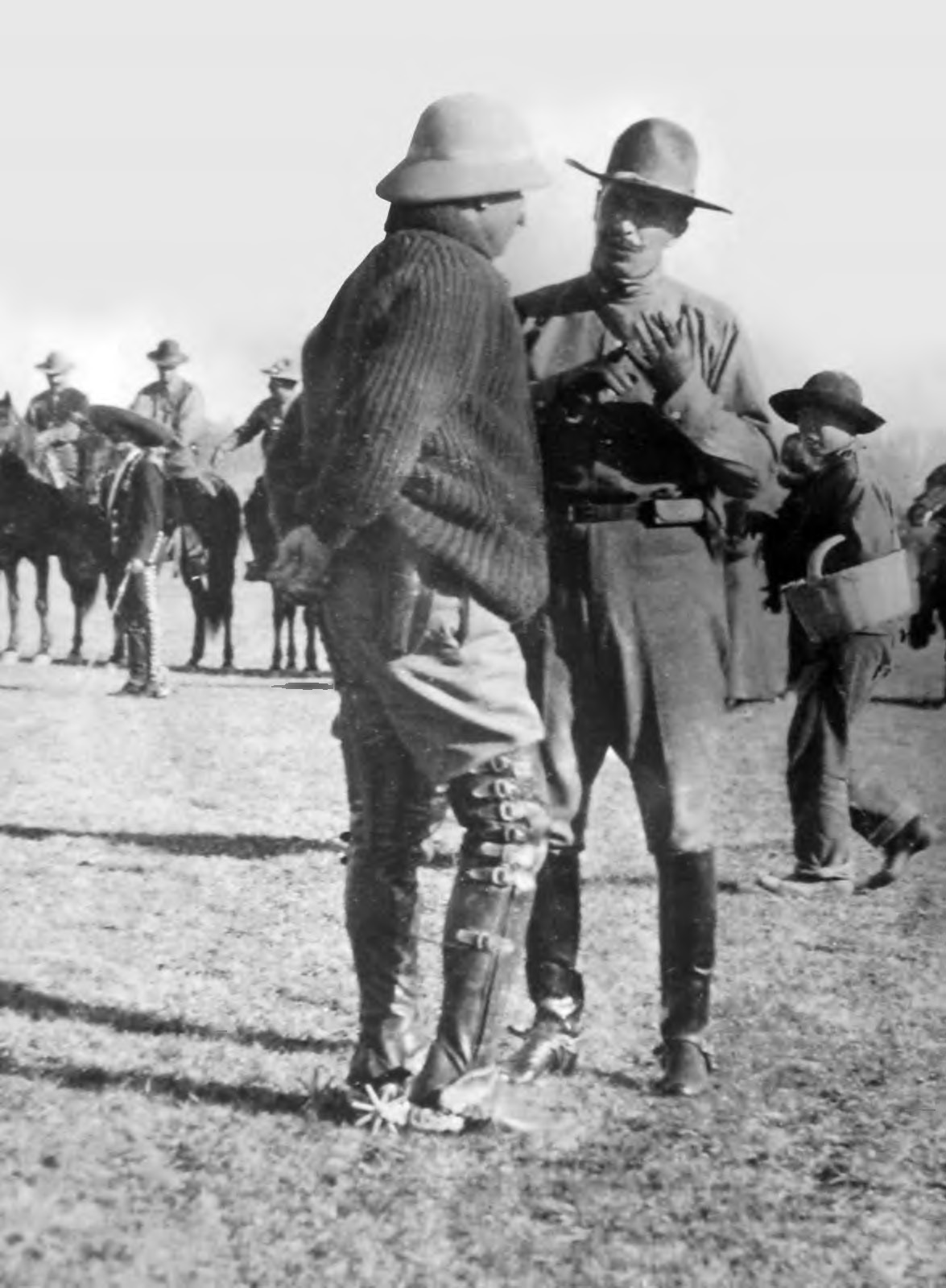
Ángeles and Villa during the Anti-Huerta campaign.

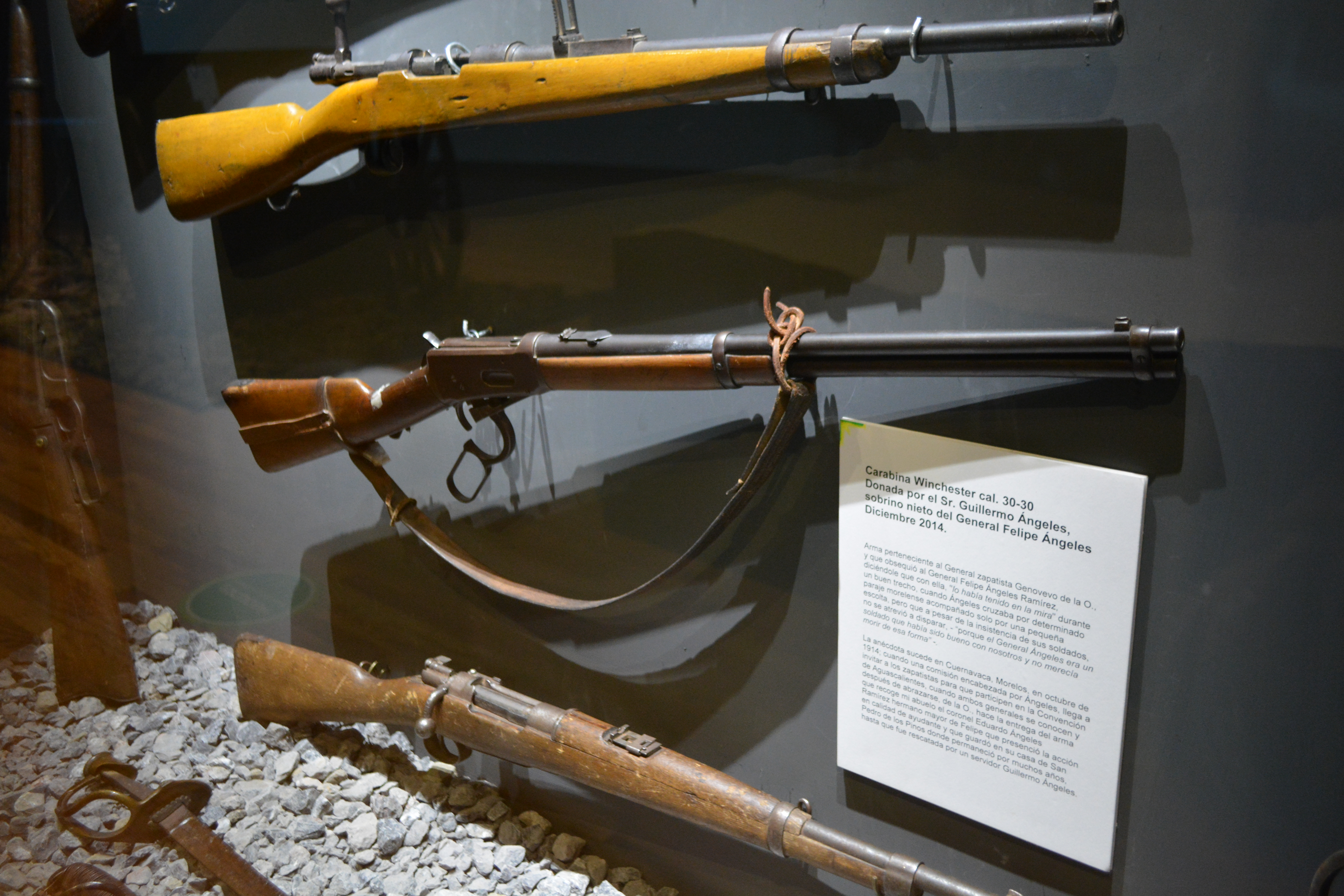
Winchester rifle that belongs to the General Genovevo de la O and given to Felipe Ángeles as a gift. Toma de Zacatecas museum, Zacatecas.

General Ángeles became one of Villa's principal military and intellectual advisers. He participated as Chief of Artillery in the great military triumphs of 1914: the capture of Torreón, the Battles of San Pedro de las Colonias and Paredón, and the capture of Zacatecas in May 1914. Just before the attack on Zacatecas, Ángeles played a major role in the so-called 'disobedience of the generals' of the Division of the North, countermanding Carranza's order to halt their advance on Zacatecas and Mexico City. The generals' 'disobedience' ensured the defeat of Huerta's army, but precipitated a split between Carranza and Villa.

After the defeat of Huerta, Ángeles participated in the October 1914 Convention of Aguascalientes as Villa's representative. The Convention of Aguascalientes, called to bring an end to hostilities, resulted in a complete break between Villa and Carranza. Ángeles remained with the Villa faction as civil war broke out again in early 1915. Ángeles, in his first independent command, captured the city of Monterrey in January 1915. However, Villa's forces were decisively defeated in the spring of 1915 by Carranza's General Obregón, and Ángeles was forced to flee Mexico and settle in exile in Texas. There he attempted to make a living as a dairy farmer.

While in Texas, he joined the Liberal Mexican Alliance, which sought to bring together exiles of various ideological persuasions linked by the common aim to stop the war and form a coalition government. When World War I ended in November 1918, Mexico under Carranza was still engaged in civil war. Ángeles became convinced that the United States would invade and occupy Mexico if the combatants could not reach a peace accord. In December 1918, Ángeles returned to Chihuahua clandestinely and joined up again with Pancho Villa. Villa at this time no longer commanded an army, but instead was only able to conduct guerrilla raids. He was then being pursued by both the Mexican and American military. Ángeles, a conciliator, pacifist, and philanthropic socialist wanted peace, but he was unable to convince Villa to cease hostilities.

== Final year, trial and execution ==
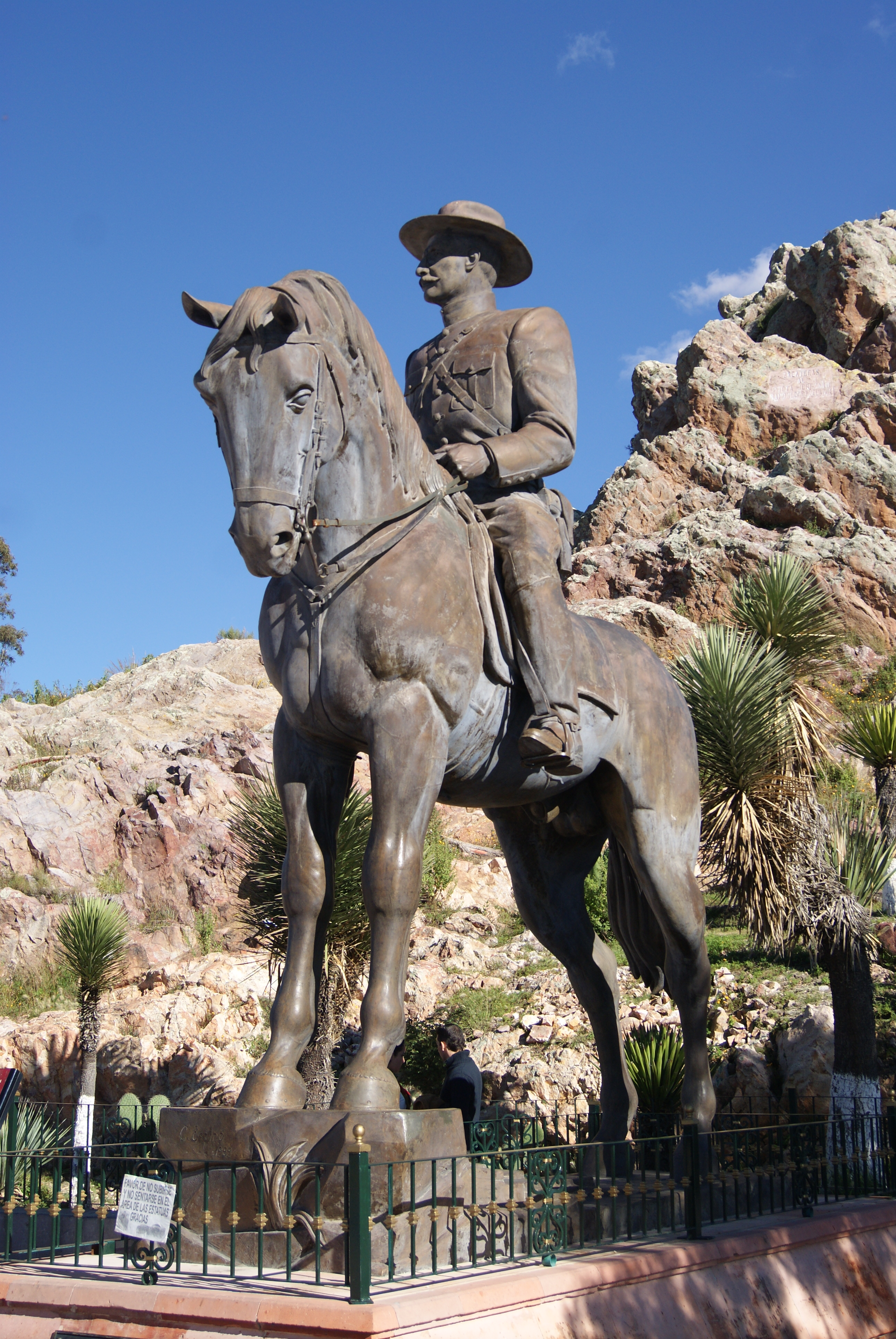
An equestrian statue of General Ángeles on Bufa Hill, Zacatecas.

After Villa's raid on Ciudad Juárez in June 1919 (in which Ángeles did not participate), Ángeles became despondent that there was no solution to the long and bloody civil war. Tired, ill, and very disillusioned, he departed Villa's camp. Wandering for a time without funds or support, he was betrayed and arrested by the Carranza government. He was court-martialed in a show-trial in Ciudad Chihuahua. Knowing that Carranza would never pardon him, Ángeles made a heroic and impassioned defense in response to his enemies' case for the prosecution. At 10:45 pm on November 25, 1919, the court-martial condemned him to death, and on November 26, 1919, in front of the state penitentiary in Chihuahua, he was executed.

== Legacy ==
On April 24, 2019, Mexican President Andrés Manuel López Obrador announced that construction on a new Mexico City airport would begin on Monday, April 29, 2019, and that it would be named Felipe Ángeles International Airport. The airport began commercial operations on 21 March, 2022. The train station at the airport is named AIFA-Clara Krause, after his wife.

== Books ==
- Slattery, Matthew: Felipe Ángeles and the Mexican Revolution, 1982
- Katz, Friedrich: The Life and Times of Pancho Villa, 1998
- Jackson, Byron: "The Political and Military Role of General Felipe Angeles in the Mexican Revolution, 1914-15" (1976, an unpublished dissertation submitted to the faculty of the Graduate School of Georgetown University, 1976)
- Felipe Angeles is a major character in The Friends of Pancho Villa (1996), a novel by James Carlos Blake

Military offices
Preceded by Joaquín Beltrán Castañares	Director of the Heroico Colegio Militar; 1912–1913	Succeeded by Miguel Bernard
