= José Refugio Velasco =

Mexican general and politician (1849-1919)

Divisional general José Refugio Velasco
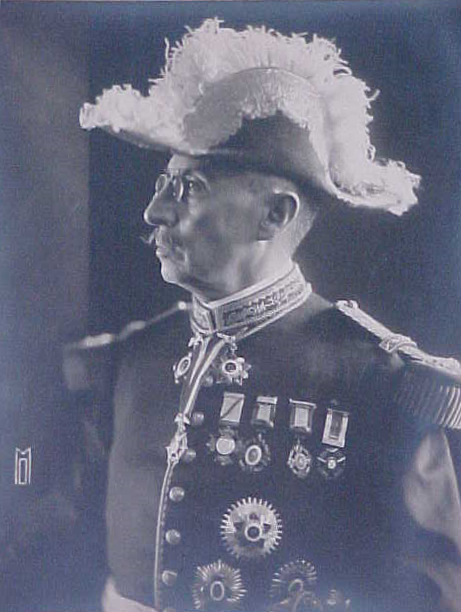

Governor of the State of Mexico
- In office July 12, 1913 – October 11, 1913
- President: Victoriano Huerta
- Preceded by: Francisco León de la Barra
- Succeeded by: Joaquín Beltrán Castañares

Governor of San Luis Potosí
- In office May 15, 1914 – June 2, 1914
- Preceded by: Francisco Romero
- Succeeded by: Ricardo Muñoz

Governor of Coahuila
- In office November 18, 1913 – November 21, 1913
- Preceded by: Joaquin Maas Aguila
- Succeeded by: Praxedis de la Peña García

Secretary of War and Navy of Mexico
- In office November 18, 1913 – November 21, 1913
- President: Francisco Carvajal
- Preceded by: Aureliano Blanquet
- Succeeded by: Eduardo Hay

Personal details
- Born: José Refugio Velasco Martínez; July 4, 1849 Aguascalientes City, Aguascalientes, Mexico
- Died: March 27, 1919 (aged 69) Mexico City, Mexico

Military service
- Allegiance: Restored Republic; Porfiriato; Federales
- Branch: Mexican Army
- Years of service: 1866 – 1914
- Rank: Divisional General
- Battles/wars: Second French intervention in Mexico: Battle of San Jacinto; Siege of Querétaro; Battle of San Juan Epatlan Puebla; Yaqui Wars; Mexican Revolution: Second Battle of Torreón

José Refugio Velasco Martínez (1849-1919) was a Mexican Divisional general as well as a governor of several Mexican states. He enlisted in the Mexican army when he was 17 years old, where he carried out his entire military life without going through any military college, fully training in the field. He stood out in the Second French Intervention in Mexico, during the Porfiriato, and finally in the Mexican Revolution. He came to play the position of Secretary of War and Navy of Mexico and had a relevant role in the end of the dictatorship of Victoriano Huerta.

== Earlier Years ==
José Refugio Velasco Martínez was born on July 4, 1849, in the city of Aguascalientes City, being baptized four days later in the parish church.

On May 25, 1866, at the age of 17, he joined the Mexican Army when, in reaction to the abuses committed against his family by the French leaders who occupied the country because they considered them supporters of Benito Juárez, he voluntarily enlisted to the column of the Chihuahua National Guard commanded by Colonel Pedro Yépez and, at that time, was near El Parral. The following year he joined the regular army, thus taking part in the Second French Intervention in Mexico pitting himself against the Second Mexican Empire. participated in the Siege of Queretaro under the orders of Mariano Escobedo. He also took part in the Battle of San Jacinto.

== Life during the Porfiriato and the Mexican Revolution ==
From 1871 to 1906 he participated in the Yaqui Wars in Sonora with uprisings such as the Guerrillas of Tetabiate and later campaigns of the Yaqui Wars at the end of the so-called Paz de Ortíz in 1897. He directly participated in the fighting of Zamauaca, Cerro del Gallo, Agua Alta, Cerro de Chunamove, Cerro de Huamare, Cajón del Álamo, Llano de los Algodones and Cerro de Zamahuaca; and shootings at Realito de Cumuripa, Puerto de Vázquez, Cerro de Zamahuaca, Tinaja del Bacatete and Cerro de Bachomobampo.

In 1871 he was in the attack on the Citadel of Mexico and San Juan Epatlán, in the expedition from Mexico to the State of Hidalgo where he fought in Tenango and Tenguedó . He faced the rebels led by Colonel J. García de la Cadena in Zacatecas. He participated in an expedition to Oaxaca where he was in the fighting that took place in Tecomavaca, Los Cires, Tequila and Veracruz. He also participated in expeditions to the states of Puebla and Morelos where he participated in the fighting of San Pedro Coayuca, Rancho de Tlachinola, Jonatecatepe and San Juan Epatlán.

In the states of Chihuahua and Coahuila, he participated in the repression of the different uprisings and disturbances that occurred as well as persecuting groups of people living in Durango.

He was appointed Brigadier General by President Francisco I. Madero and named Velasco Military Chief of Veracruz and Military Commander of Mexico City until the imposition of Victoriano Huerta by the coup known as the Ten Tragic Days.

Velasco informed Huerta that he would not recognize him until he was officially appointed, which he did as soon as Congress recognized Victoriano Huerta as president of Mexico. On July 14, 1913, Huerta appointed him Governor and military Commander of the states of Mexico, San Luis Potosí and Coahuila on November 18 of that same year. He is appointed deputy in the XXVI Legislature and subsequently promoted to Divisional General and assigned as commander of the Nazas Division.

=== Second Battle of Torreón ===
The towns of Torreón and Gómez Palacio were in the hands of the Villista chiefs, Calixto Contreras and the Arrieta brothers. On December 9, 1913, Velasco attacked these squares by capturing them. After heavy fighting, the fight intensified on March 30 and 31. On April 2, Velasco's troops withdrew, giving victory to Francisco Villa in the so-called Second Battle of Torreón. Velasco went with his troops to San Pedro de las Colonias where Federal Army troops had been quartered. He arrived on April 5 and reorganized the combat preparations. The meeting took place on Tuesday, April 14, 1914, where General Villa defeated Velasco's troops.

While Velasco was on his way to Torreón, Victoriano Huerta ordered Juan Andreu Almazán to be shot but Velasco opposed to it, preventing his execution.

Later, Pancho Villa would exhort Velasco not to surrender the Plaza de México to Álvaro Obregón and to unite his troops with his, offering him support with the division of his command to fight together against the Carrancistas, Obregonistas and against the invading Americans.

== Secretary of War and Navy ==
On May 16, 1914, José Velasco was appointed governor of San Luis Potosí. On July 15, Victoriano Huerta resigned as president and Francisco S. Carvajal was appointed as interim president, who appointed José Velasco as Secretary of War and Navy. On July 24, he expelled Victoriano Huerta from the country but refused to leave Mexico.

== Treaties of Teoloyucan ==
The United States threatened to take over Mexico City with the troops already occupying the port of Veracruz, General Velasco opts, after talks with Alfredo Robles Domínguez, to dissolve the Federal Army thus avoiding direct confrontation with the United States. To do this, he edited two manifestos, one to the army and the other to the nation, which materialized in the Teoloyucan Treaties signed on August 13, 1914, where the stipulated physical delivery of the federal corporations was authorized, signed by General Álvaro Obregón giving passed to the Constitutionalist Army led by Venustiano Carranza, ending the Huerta Regime.

Honored with the confidence of almost all the General Residents in Mexico, who offered me on a solemn occasion, to accept the resolution that the current Government gave to the transcendental problem, of the attitude that the Army should assume in the presence of the political situation for which crosses the country, committing to support it with its subsequent conduct, through the obligation contracted by me, that said solution would be within the law and military honor, I address all of you, the members of the Army, Generals, Chiefs, Officers and selfless troop, with the assurance that my words will find an echo in the conscience of each one of you, conscience formed in the heat of all the noblest ideals, all self-denial and the sacrosanct love of honor and country. The army, Deposing all that could be misunderstood pride, it loyally and spontaneously contracted before the entire Republic, the solemn commitment not to blood more the native soil with the civil war. If unfortunately this is not the case, if some, following a path other than the one laid out, throw on the Army the reproach of their lack of patriotism, the anathema of honorable men and the curses of the homeland fall on them, for having failed in their duty to do so. citizens and their honor as soldiers. Mexico City, August 13, 1914. (Signed) .- The General, JR Velasco They will throw on the Army the reproach of their lack of patriotism, let the anathema of honorable men and the curses of the country fall on them, for having failed in their duty as citizens and their honor as soldiers. Mexico City, August 13, 1914. (Signed) .- The General, JR Velasco They will throw on the Army the reproach of their lack of patriotism, let the anathema of honorable men and the curses of the country fall on them, for having failed in their duty as citizens and their honor as soldiers. Mexico City, August 13, 1914. (Signed)

— J. R. Velasco

On August 15, 1914, before the First Chief of the Constitutionalist Army, Venustiano Carranza entered the city, he left the Federal District after meeting with General Álvaro Obregón and met in Veracruz with General Jesús Carranza to let him know that he had fulfilled the pact. Carranza requests information from the Federal District and Venustiano Carranza states in writing on August 21 that

...aware with satisfaction of having complied with General Velasco with the agreed agreements. You can assure him that you have all kinds of guarantees to stay in the country, if you wish and, if not, you can go abroad for as long as you like and with the authorization of this First Headquarters to return to the country, keeping in mind the trait that he had when answering the usurper Victoriano Huerta, that if President Madero arrived in Veracruz, he would continue to recognize him as the First President of the Nation. I greet you warmly. Venustiano Carranza.

Even so, José Refugio Velasco went into exile to the United States.

On February 8, 1919, in a very delicate state of health, he returned to Mexico and settled in Mexico City where he died at dawn on March 27, 1919, being buried the next day in the Panteón Francés de la Piedad and later his remains were deposited in a crypt in the Metropolitan Cathedral.
