= Francisco S. Carvajal =

President of Mexico in 1914

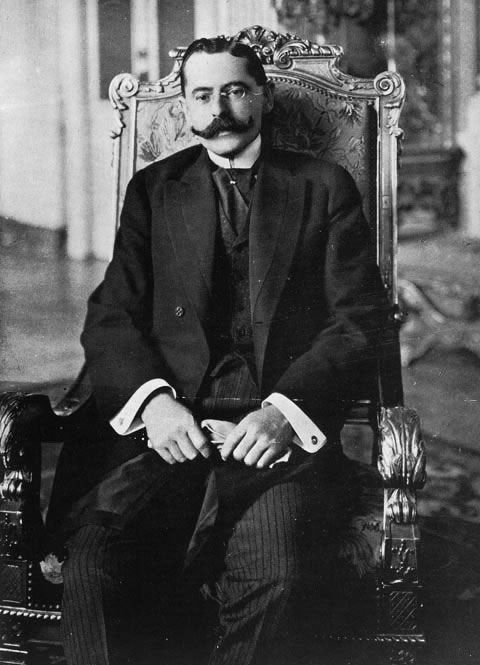
- Carvajal in 1914

40th President of Mexico
- In office 15 July – 13 August 1914
- Vice President: Vacant (Note: José María Pino Suárez was Mexico's last vice president, and he and President Francisco I. Madero were overthrown in 1913. The vice presidency would eventually be abolished with the adoption of Mexico's current constitution in 1917.)
- Preceded by: Victoriano Huerta
- Succeeded by: Eulalio Gutiérrez (Convention of Aguascalientes); Venustiano Carranza (1917 Constitution) (Note: Carvajal resigned without designating a successor. He left General Eduardo Iturbide in charge of Mexico City's security, and on 15 August General Álvaro Obregón of Venustiano Carranza's Constitutional Army entered the city to assume command. On 6 August the Convention of Aguascalientes named Eulalio Gutiérrez as president and demanded that Carranza step down. He refused and continued to lead the executive. Carranza finally assumed the presidency in 1917 following the promulgation of a new constitution.)

Secretary of Foreign Affairs
- In office 10 July – 15 July 1914
- President: Victoriano Huerta
- Preceded by: Roberto Esteva Ruiz
- Succeeded by: Rafael Díaz Iturbide

Personal details
- Born: Francisco Sebastián Carvajal y Gual; 9 December 1870 San Francisco de Campeche, Campeche, Mexico
- Died: 30 September 1932 (aged 61) Mexico City, Mexico
- Resting place: Panteón Francés
- Education: National Autonomous University of Mexico

Francisco Sebastián Carvajal y Gual (Note: Some sources spell his name as Carbajal. He used the spelling Carvajal.) (9 December 1870 – 30 September 1932) was a Mexican lawyer and politician who served briefly as president in 1914, during the Mexican Revolution. In his role as secretary of foreign affairs, he succeeded Victoriano Huerta as president upon the latter's resignation.

== Biography ==
Francisco Sebastián Carvajal y Gual was born on 9 December 1870 in San Francisco de Campeche, Campeche. He was the son of Francisco Carvajal and Mercedes Gual. Carvajal received his primary and secondary education in Campeche. He then attended the National Autonomous University of Mexico (UNAM) in Mexico City. From 1890 to 1895, he studied law and received his degree from UNAM's National School of Law. He then began to work as a lawyer.

Carvajal's knowledge from his legal profession allowed him to hold public office during the rule of President Porfirio Díaz. In 1901 he was the general secretary for the state of Campeche, and then served as a substitute senator for Tomás Azuar y Cano. He was then the secretary general for the government of the state of Tabasco, and in 1908 he negotiated the borders between Tabasco and Chiapas. On 3 October of that year, he was made a justice on the Supreme Court, holding a seat in the third chamber. On May 3, 1911, Díaz named him as his representative at the peace conference with constitutionalist rebel Francisco I. Madero. In 1913, after Victoriano Huerta had seized power from Madero, Huerta named him president of the Supreme Court.

On 10 July 1914, Huerta named him to the cabinet as secretary of foreign affairs, succeeding Roberto Esteva Ruiz. When Huerta resigned on 15 July, Carvajal was legally next-in-line to the presidency and assumed the office.

He appointed a cabinet consisting of José María Luján as secretary of the interior, Rafael Díaz Iturbide as secretary of foreign affairs, Gilberto Trujillo as secretary of finance and public credit, José Refugio Velasco as secretary of war and navy, Jesús M. Ochoa as secretary of communications and public works, Rubén Valenti as secretary of public instruction and fine arts, Eduardo Preciat Castillo as secretary of justice, Antonio Escandón as secretary of industry and commerce, and Carlos Noriega as secretary of agriculture and colonization. Ochoa was later replaced by Isaac Bustamante and Noriega by Manuel R. Vera.

During his month-long presidential term, he oversaw the transfer of power to Venustiano Carranza and his Constitutionalist Army under the terms of the Teoloyucan Treaties. Carvajal left control of Mexico City in the hands of General Eduardo Iturbide, the governor of the Federal District, and on the morning of 13 August, he fled the city for Veracruz to leave the country. Carranza gained de facto control of the executive the following year, despite not being formally elected to the Presidency until 1917.

Carvajal left for the United States. In New Orleans, he met and married Louise Martin. They had one child, Francisco Carvajal, on October 19, 1918.

He returned to Mexico in 1922 or 1924 and continued his legal career. He died in Mexico City on 30 September 1932. He was buried in the Panteón Francés.

== See also ==
- List of heads of state of Mexico

== Notes ==
Political offices
Preceded by Victoriano Huerta	President of Mexico; 15 July – 13 August 1914	Succeeded by Venustiano Carranza
