= Pedro Hinojosa =

Mexican politician and military general

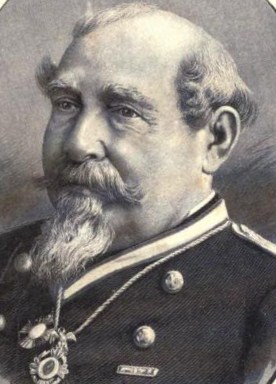

Secretary of War and Navy
- In office 1 December 1884 – 20 March 1896
- President: Porfirio Díaz
- Preceded by: Francisco Naranjo
- Succeeded by: Felipe Berriozábal
- In office 22 December 1861 – 2 May 1862
- President: Benito Juárez
- Preceded by: Ignacio Zaragoza
- Succeeded by: Miguel Blanco Múzquiz

Personal details
- Born: 31 January 1822 Villa del Refugio, Mexico
- Died: 5 March 1903 (aged 81) Mexico City, Mexico
- Party: Liberal

Pedro Hinojosa de la Garza Falcón (31 January 1822, Matamoros, Tamaulipas - 5 March 1903, Mexico City) was a Mexican politician and military general who fought in the Mexican–American War, the Reform War, and in the French intervention in Mexico. In addition, Hinojosa was governor of Durango, Nuevo Leon, and Chihuahua, and served as Secretary of War and Navy.

== Military career ==
Pedro Hinojosa was born in Matamoros, Tamaulipas to Ramón Hinojosa and his wife Mamerta de la Garza Falcón. Hinojosa eventually enlisted in the National Guard of Tamaulipas at the age of 18. In Tamaulipas, he fought the Texan rebels and the Apache and Comanche tribes, who maintained determined against the government. In 1848, during the Mexican–American War, Hinojosa rose through the ranks and became a lieutenant. He continued to defend Tamaulipas through its national guard until 1854, the year he was elected as a lieutenant colonel due to his efforts in protecting local territories from the Texan military and the native tribes.

=== Reform War ===
In 1854, Hinojosa adhered to the Plan of Ayutla against Antonio López de Santa Anna joining the national guard of Tamaulipas, and having ascended to the position of colonel in the triumph of the revolution, became a permanent formal member of the military. After the coup by Félix María Zuloaga he remained loyal to the government of Benito Juárez and fought with the liberal band during the Reform War, fighting in the Batalla de Lomas Largas, in the siege of Monterrey, where he was made a prisoner by the conservatives. He later escaped and fought in the attack on Zacatecas under the orders of General Juan Zuazua, as well as the attacks on San Luis Potosí and Guadalajara in 1858. For this last actions, he was promoted to the rank of brigadier general in November 1858.

Hinojosa continued fighting the conservatives in the Bajio area and later in northern Mexico. In May 1859 he was defeated in La Flor, Durango by the conservative leader Domingo Cajén. In this battle, Hinojosa suffered a leg injury and due to this he walked with a limp the rest of his life. After this battle he traveled to the state of Chihuahua where he assumed leadership of the garrison substituting for Luis Terrazes who had gone to battle the Tulices rebels. The Tulices rebels were conservative forces from Durango who were under the direction of Cajén. After the triumph of the liberals and nomination to federal elections, Hinojosa was elected a general delegate for the Federal Electoral District I of Chihuahua to the II Legislature of 1863. Hinojosa was to move to Mexico City to carry out this office from May 1861 to May 1863, but while traveling through the city of Durango and due to the illness of the governor of that state, General Jose Maria Patoni, the Congress of Durango named Hinojosa governor, a position in which he served from July to August 1861.

=== French intervention in Mexico ===
Hinojosa thereafter fulfilled the office of federal delegate until December 22, 1861, when president Benito Juárez named him Secretary of War and Navy. His responsibilities included initiating the preparations for defending the county from French intervention. Hinojosa fulfilled this post until May 2, 1862, which was 3 days before the Mexican victory over the French in the Battle of Puebla.

Hinojosa moved on to active service having at his charge several different military bodies. He participated in the defense of the city of Puebla de Zaragoza which was besieged by the French troops and had to surrender in 1863, falling prisoner to the invaders. He was able to escape when he was being transported to Veracruz and he headed north to join the Juárez forces. During the rift between the Nuevo Leon chief Santiago Vidaurri and Benito Juárez, Hinojosa briefly took Vidaurri's side but he soon reconsidered his decision and reaffirmed his loyalty to Juárez, escorting Juárez's family to what was then the Texas territory. To combat the influence of Vidaurri, on August 15, 1864, Juárez declared the separation of the states of Coahuila and Nuevo Leon and designated Hinojosa as the Governor of Nuevo Leon until December 1864. Hinojosa was then given the leadership of the republican troops in Tamaulipas and together with Mariano Escobedo they victoriously attacked the imperialist garrison in the port of Matamoros.

=== Rebellions of La Noria and Tuxtepec ===
After the republican victory, Hinojosa stayed in the military permanently. In 1871 he joined the uprising in favor of Porfirio Díaz pursuing the Plan of La Noria against Benito Juárez, in which he was defeated and taken prisoner in Saltillo. He was able to escape and later was given amnesty by the new president Sebastian Lerdo de Tejada. Hinojosa again joined an uprising in favor of Díaz and the Plan of Tuxtepec, fighting in Matamoros, la Huasteca and the port of Tuxpan, ultimately contributing to Diaz's victory.

Díaz named Hinojosa military commander of the state of Chihuahua on June 4, 1877, and governor on June 13 of the same year. In appointing Hinojosa, Díaz aimed to end a conflict between the head of the pro-Díaz Chihuahuan forces Jose Eligio Muñoz and the head of the Chihuahuan federal forces Juan B. Caamaño. Hinojosa remained in this post until August 14, 1878 at which time he turned over the governorship to his constitutionally elected successor Angel Trias Ochoa. Hinojosa's governorship included an unprecedented action in which he was arrested and imprisoned under the orders of the head of the Iturbide camp, Jose Gonzalez Salas, without respecting Hinojosa's constitutional authority as governor. The arrest was due to a criminal complaint filed by the journalist Tomas Cordero Zuza who opposed Hinojosa and whom Hinojosa had struck on the head when he ran into Zuza in the Plaza Hidalgo in the city of Chihuahua. Hinojosa remained in prison until he was granted a federal appeal, which was followed by a trial in which he was found innocent.

== Secretary of War and Navy ==
After completing his term as governor of the state of Chihuahua, Hinojosa assumed control of the military of Chihuahua until 1878, when he was named the head of the injured body of the military. He was later elected federal delegate to the XII Legislature for the state of Hidalgo from 1884 to 1886. However, on December 1, 1884 he was named Secretary of War and Navy by President Porfirio Díaz. He remained in this post for 12 years until March 20, 1896 at which time he resigned due to his health. He went on to serve as the president of the Supreme Court of Military Justice for more than a year until he finally retired from the military.

Hinojosa died in Mexico City on March 5, 1903.
