= Mark Brill =

American musicologist

- Born: Mark Eberhardt Brill; January 19, 1964 (age 62); Houston, Texas
- Education: Lycée Franco Mexicain (Baccalauréat, 1983); Oberlin College (B.A., 1987); Loyola University New Orleans School of Law (J.D., 1990); Tulane University (M.A., 1992); University of California, Davis (Ph.D., 1998)
- Occupation: Musicologist
- Known for: Scholarship on Music of Latin America and the Caribbean
- Title: Associate Professor of Music, University of Texas, San Antonio

Mark Brill (born January 19, 1964) is an American musicologist, particularly known for his work on Latin American Music. He is Associate Professor of Music at the University of Texas, San Antonio.

== Life and career ==
Brill was born in Houston, Texas on January 19, 1964. He grew up in Mexico City, Mexico, where he attended the Lycée Franco Mexicain, receiving the French Baccalauréat in 1983. He then attended Oberlin College (receiving his B.A. in 1987), the Loyola University New Orleans College of Law (J.D., 1990), Tulane University (M.A. in Music History, 1992), and the University of California, Davis (Ph.D. in Musicology, 1998). His doctoral dissertation was a study of colonial music at the cathedral in Oaxaca, Mexico.

In 2001, he joined the faculty of the University of Dayton, in Dayton, Ohio, and in 2007 he joined the faculty of the University of Texas, San Antonio. He received tenure from UT San Antonio in 2013. He has published several articles on film music.

He authored the 2010 textbook Music of Latin America and the Caribbean (published by Prentice Hall). The book was reviewed by Latin American Music Review's Daniel Sheehy, who said the "amount of detail and the historical and cultural swath it covers are impressive". Sheehy praised Brill's writing for being "clear, engaging, and appropriate for undergraduates as well as for more advanced students". Indiana University professor Eric Bindler reviewed the book in the Journal of Folklore Research. Bindler criticized the book for having a "a number of significant shortcomings" such as Brill's "lack of recognition of or reference to the more authoritative ethnomusicological and other scholarly sources" though he concluded that it was "a valuable contribution to the field overall". Many of these issues were addressed in the second edition (2018) of the textbook.

== Bibliography ==
- Music of Latin America and the Caribbean, Prentice Hall, 2010 (author), ISBN 0131839446
- Music of Latin America and the Caribbean, 2nd Ed. Taylor & Francis, 2018 (author), ISBN 1138053562
