= Teoloyucan Treaties =

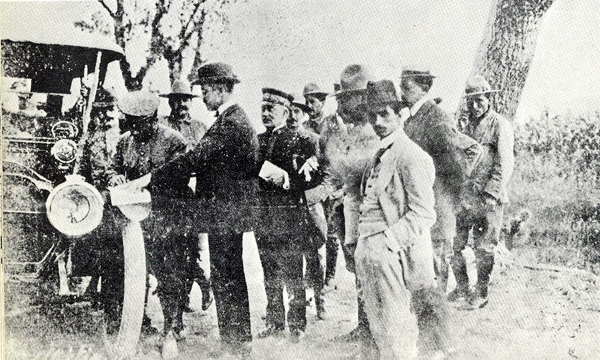
Signature of the Treaties of Teoloyucan, signed on a car fender.

The Teoloyucan Treaties were signed on August 13, 1914, at Teoloyucan, State of Mexico, Mexico between the revolutionary army and forces loyal to Victoriano Huerta. The Constitutionalist Army of First Chief Venustiano Carranza was represented by Álvaro Obregón and Lucio Blanco. The Federal Army was represented by General Gustavo A. Salas and Admiral Othón P. Blanco, while Mexico City was represented by Eduardo Iturbe. The treaties established the surrender of the Federal Army and its dissolution.

== Background ==
In the middle of July 1914, the Huerta government realized that a revolutionary victory was imminent. On July 15 Huerta resigned the presidency and went into exile.

The new government tried to negotiate with the revolutionaries. These negotiations broke down when the revolutionaries demanded the surrender of the capital as well as the dissolution of the federal army.

In August, due to the victories of Venustiano Carranza, interim president Francisco S. Carbajal finally offered an unconditional surrender. The entire cabinet went into exile the next day.

== Treaty ==
Accompanied by a Brazilian minister, a French delegate and a U.S. representative, Carbajal went to Teoluyacan and attempted to discuss terms. When this failed, the entire cabinet went into exile. The treaty was signed on August 13. Eduardo Iturbide, governor of Mexico City, and a Huerta sympathizer, signed the surrender of the city. General Gustavo A. Salas and Admiral Othón P. Blanco signed the articles concerning the military.

The treaty codified the unconditional surrender of the Federal Army to the Constitutionalist Army, followed by the Federal Army's dissolution. There were no provisions for a general amnesty. Venustiano Carranza refused to allow the continued existence of the Federal Army, the fatal flaw of Madero's regime. Constitutionalist Army general Alvaro Obregón would take control of the city, guaranteeing protection from looting for the population of Mexico City. Realizing that the Zapatistas were a continuing threat, Obregón allowed Federal soldiers to remain in place in the southern part of Mexico City, closest to Zapata's stronghold in Morelos, until the Constitutionalist Army could take control. Obregón included the texts of the treaties in his war memoir.

After the dissolution of the Federal Army, Carranza issued a decree suppressing the Military Academy. It reopened its doors in 1920 after Carranza's fall. The Constitutionalist Army was the Mexican army until then.
