= Federal Army =

- Ejército Federal
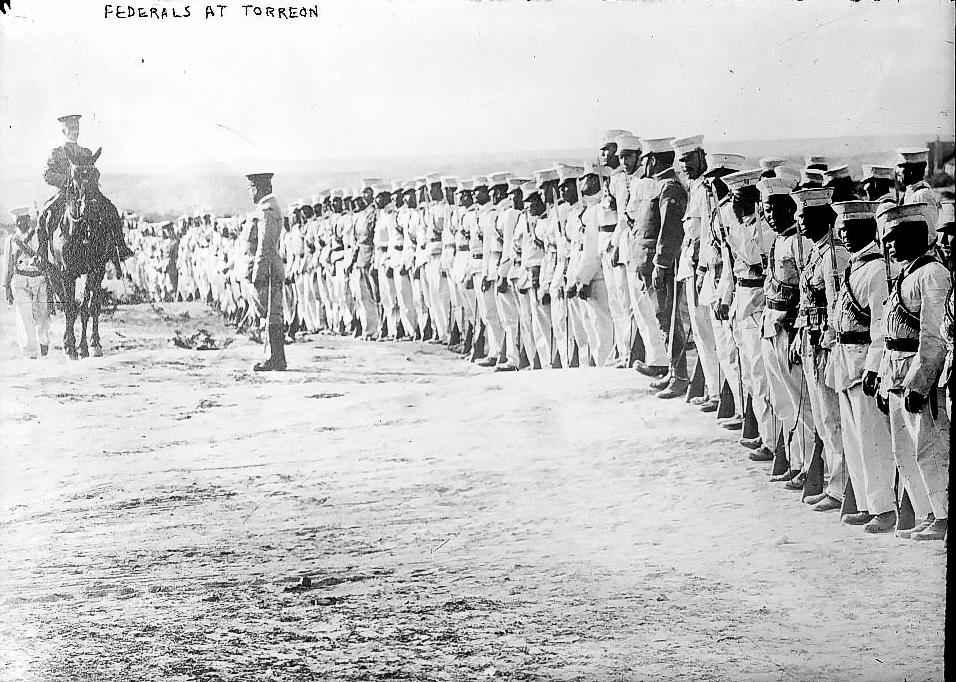
- Federales in Torreón, Coahuila, c. 1914, during the presidency of Victoriano Huerta
- Active: 1876–1914
- Disbanded: August 13, 1914
- Country: Mexico
- Allegiance: Porfirio Díaz (1876–1911); Francisco I. Madero (1911–1913); Victoriano Huerta (1913–1914)
- Engagements: Mexican Revolution

In Mexico, the Federal Army (Spanish: Ejército Federal; also known as the Federales or Federals in popular culture) was the army of Mexico from 1876 to 1914 during the Porfiriato, the rule of President Porfirio Díaz, and during the presidencies of Francisco I. Madero and Victoriano Huerta. Under President Díaz, a military hero against the French Intervention in Mexico, the senior officers of the Federal Army had served in long-ago conflicts; at the time of the outbreak of the Mexican Revolution, most were old men, incapable of leading troops on the battlefield. When the rebellions broke out against Díaz following fraudulent elections in 1910, the Federal Army was incapable of responding.

Although revolutionary fighters helped bring Francisco I. Madero to power, Madero retained the Federal Army rather than the revolutionaries. Madero used the Federal Army to suppress rebellions against his government by Pascual Orozco and Emiliano Zapata. Madero placed General Victoriano Huerta as interim commander of the military during the Ten Tragic Days of February 1913 to defend his government. Huerta changed sides and ousted Madero's government. Rebellions broke out against Huerta's regime. When revolutionary armies succeeded in ousting Huerta in July 1914, the Federal Army ceased to exist as an entity, with the signing of the Teoloyucan Treaties.

== Under Díaz, 1876–1911 ==
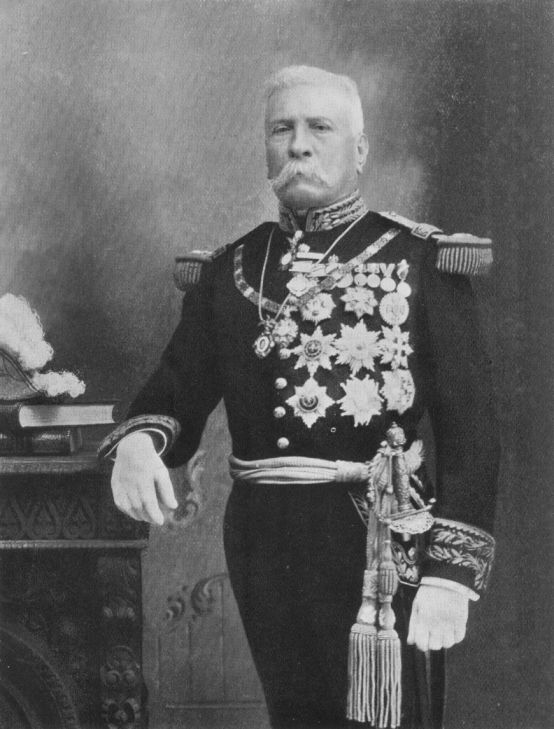
General and President Porfirio Díaz

The Federal Army in Mexico had long been an interventionist force in Mexican politics, with notable generals becoming Presidents of Mexico. After the War of the Reform and the successful ouster of the French empire in Mexico in 1867, the soldiers who defeated them were adherents of the liberalism. General Porfirio Díaz rose through the ranks without formal military training, and was a hero of the Battle of Puebla on 5 May 1862. He came to power by coup in 1876, ousting the civilian President Sebastián Lerdo. Díaz knew the power and the danger of a strong military and once he became President of Mexico, he sought to curtail the power of the generals, who held provincial power and were not under control of the central government. It took him "nearly fifteen years to achieve full military control." He did so by a combination of bribes and other economic lures for those he could not confront militarily. He divided Mexico into eleven military zones, whose boundaries did not correspond to state boundaries. To prevent collusion between the state governors, whom he appointed, and military commanders, he rotated commanders on a regular basis so that they could not build a local power base. By a variety of means, he reduced the officer corps by 500, including 25 generals.

Díaz also sought to professionalize the army. He moved the Mexican Military Academy back to Chapultepec Castle, the Presidential residence. In 1847, cadets at the academy resisted the invading U.S. forces, in their deaths called the Niños Héroes, but the academy was relocated and lost prestige. Díaz revived it, with cadets to be sons of "good families" (code for "white"). They were taught the arts of modern warfare. By 1900, some 9,000 graduates were officers in the Federal Army. Military training prepared cadets for war with foreign invaders, when the reality was the army dealt with internal order, along with the rural police force. By early 1900, the majority of generals in the military were not trained at the military academy, but had participated in the war against the French, that had ended some 35 years previously. The generals were old. The Federal Army was overstaffed, with far more officers commanding too few recruits, with 9,000 officers and ostensibly 25,000 enlisted men. Many who were counted as enlisted men did not exist, but were on the muster rolls because the officers received a stipend to provide food for their men. Officers pocketed the difference between the 25,000 enrolled and the 18,000 or so who actually served.

Díaz had initially said that he would not run in the 1910 presidential elections. A rich hacienda owner from Coahuila, Francisco I. Madero, published a book entitled The Presidential Succession of 1910, excoriating militarism in Mexico and calling for democracy. Madero's ideal was civilian rule. Only when it became more than clear that Díaz would remain in power by any means did Madero call for an armed rebellion against him in the 1910 Plan of San Luis Potosí. Minor rebellions broke out on the 20 November 1910 date he set, which the Federal Army suppressed. But more a more serious rebellion in Chihuahua led by Pascual Orozco and Pancho Villa demonstrated the weakness of the Federal forces, surprising the rebels. More rebellions in various parts of Mexico broke out, forcing Díaz to resign in May 1911. "Considering the small number of battles actually fought, [the rebel] triumph was more directly attributable to the weakness of the federales than to the strength of the Ejército Libertador."

== Under Madero, 1911–1913 ==
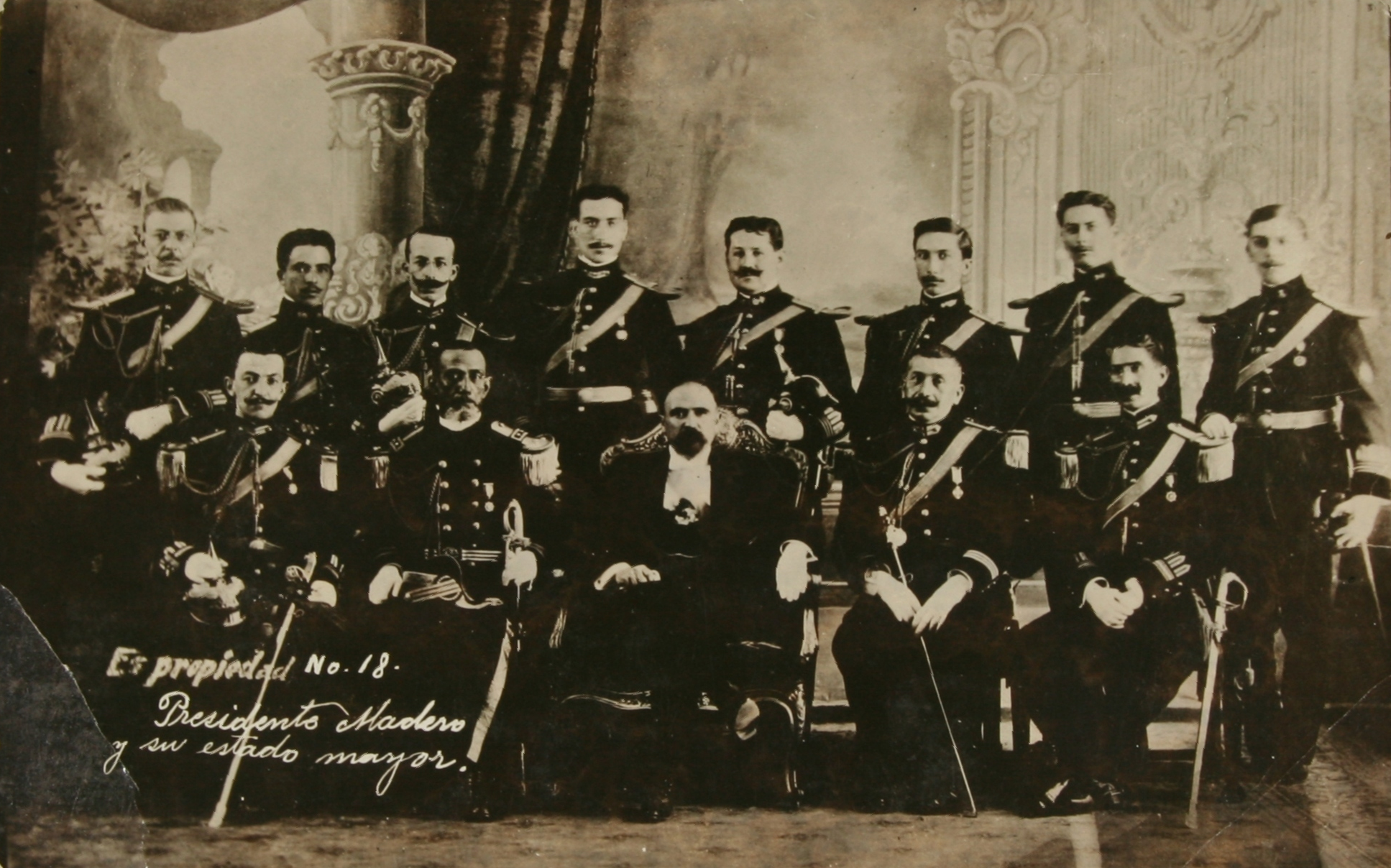
Madero and his general staff

Although the revolutionaries supporting Francisco I. Madero had shown the weakness of the Federal Army and forced Díaz to resign and go into exile, by the Treaty of Ciudad Juárez in May 1911, Madero retained the Federal Army and called for the demobilization of the revolutionaries who had enabled the victory of his cause. Revolutionary Pascual Orozco rebelled against Madero in 1912, and Madero sent the Federal Army to quash his burgeoning rebellion. Madero also sent troops to fight Emiliano Zapata, whose revolutionary forces had never demobilized and remained in rebellion until 1920. Shortly after Madero was elected president, Zapata and others issued the Plan of Ayala, declaring themselves in rebellion against Madero, since he had not moved on land reform. Madero sent the Federal Army to Morelos.

In February 1912, the Federal army consisted of 32,594 regulars and 15,550 irregulars. This was far below the official number of 80,000 as stated by the army executive. By September of the same year the official strength of the army was 85,000 men. In addition there were 16,000 Rurales, 4,000 Urban Police and 16,200 Militia, rural guards and other pro-government men under arms.

== Under Huerta, 1913–1914 ==
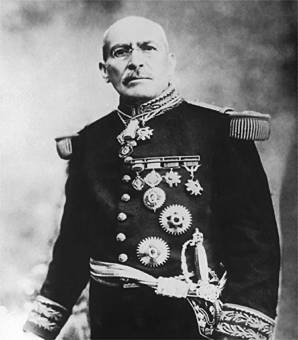
Victoriano Huerta (1850–1916), Mexican general, President of Mexico (1913–1914)

In April 1914 Huerta claimed his army had reached the size of 250,000 men, with 31 regiments of Rurales and 31,000 Militia. A more realistic assessment of his men by that July was 71,000, while U.S. observers said it was closer to 40,000. Specific numbers aside, the rapid expansion of the army had led to a deterioration in the quality of the average recruit, or more accurately, conscript. Huerta made an attempt to increase the size of the army by ordering a mass conscription (leva), of men on the streets by his press-gangs. Press-gangs would capture men as they left church or pull them from cinemas. Very few of the men under his command were volunteers and many deserted the army. Huerta tried improving morale by increasing pay in May 1913 by 50%. At the same time 382 military cadets were given commissions and attempts were made to increase the number of cadets in training.

Federal army generals were often corrupt and guilty of undermining morale with poor leadership. Some were so corrupt their dealings extended as far as selling ammunition, food and uniforms to the enemy. Also guilty of this corruption were Huerta's two sons, Victoriano Jr. and Jorge, both of whom had been placed in important positions overseeing the procurement of arms, supplies, uniforms and ammunition.

Despite these problems Huerta worked at creating an army capable of keeping him in power. He tried to expand the army by creating new units to distance them from the defeatism of the former Porfirista army. To bolster the resolve of the population he militarized society in the Prussian style, including military-style uniforms for all government employees and schoolboys and military drills on Sundays. Huerta and his general also sent 31 cadets to Europe to study military aviation in order to increase Mexico's air power.

Huerta's greatest success was attracting the support of many former rebels, such as Benjamin Argumedo, "Cheche" Campos and, most notably, Pascual Orozco, whom Huerta had fought against when serving Madero's government. Orozco offered Huerta the services of his 3,000–4,000 seasoned men, who proved essential in the fight against the Constitutionalist armies. When not helping the defense of Federal garrisons and towns, Orozco's men acted as very effective guerrillas.

== Defeat and dissolution, August 1914 ==
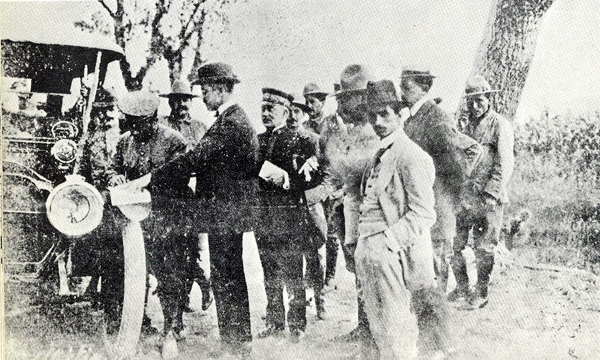
Signature of the Treaties of Teoloyucan

The Federal Army was disbanded on August 13, 1914, a month after Huerta's exile in the Teoloyucan Treaties. "Totally discredited, the old Federal army had come to the end of its run. Unable to control the Zapatistas, the Villistas, and other rebels, following the expulsion of Huerta, the Federist force disbanded and disappeared." At the time the full strength of the Federal army was 10 Generals of Division, 61 Generals of Brigade, 1,006 Jefes, 2,446 Officers, 24,800 other ranks and 7,058 horses. In addition there were 21 regiments of Rurales with 500 men in each, a total of 10,500 men.

The Federal army was replaced by the Constitutionalist Army of Venustiano Carranza under the terms of the Teoloyucan Treaties, signed by Constitutionalist general Alvaro Obregón with the commander of the Federal Army.
