= Ángel Ortiz Monasterio =

Mexican vice-admiral

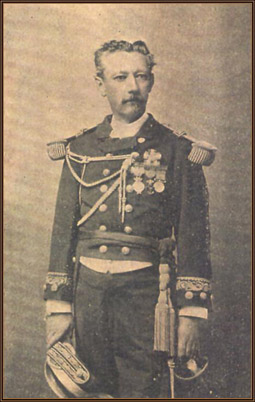

Deputy of the Congress of the Union
- In office September 16, 1882 – September 15, 1908
- President: Porfirio Díaz

Personal details
- Born: January 15, 1849 Mexico City, Mexico
- Died: March 28, 1922 (aged 73) Mexico City, Mexico

Military service
- Allegiance: Spain; North German Confederation; Porfiriato; Maderistas
- Branch: Spanish Navy; Prussian Army; Mexican Navy
- Years of service: 1868 — 1913
- Rank: Vice-Admiral
- Battles/wars: Glorious Revolution; Franco-Prussian War; Ten Years' War; Third Carlist War; Caste War of Yucatán; Mexican Revolution: Ten Tragic Days

Ángel Ortiz Monasterio Irizarri (January 15, 1849 – March 28, 1922) was a Mexican vice-admiral who contributed greatly to the Mexican Navy. He was also notable for his participation in the Ten Tragic Days of the Mexican Revolution.

== Early life ==
Monasterio was born in Mexico City, on January 15, 1849, during the Mexican-American War and his parents fled Mexico looking for a better life in Spain, where his mother was from, since at that time Mexico had lost more than half of its territory.

He studied as a military sailor in Spain, where he was an outstanding student and military man, serving the Spanish Navy in the military operations of the Glorious Revolution and in the assault on Cartagena, under the orders of General Juan Prim. During these years, the Third Carlist War and the Ten Years' War would plague Spain and events which Monasterio would participate in. For his actions, he received the Civil Order of Alfonso XII and the Medal of the Campaign of Cuba with pins from 1871, 1872 and 1873. He attended the various revolutionary movements of 1869 and 1870, later going on to direct the campaign on the island of Cuba in the fighting at Paso de San Fernando, Laguna de los Indios and the assault on the entrenched camp of Curaíto.

He was awarded the Iron Cross after making an assault on France and achieving victory; However, the military event that made him famous in the Spanish Navy was the capture of the American filibuster ship Virginius, in 1873, and that earned him the highest distinction awarded in those years by Spain: the Red Cross of Naval Merit .

Ortiz Monasterio was only 24 years old when he obtained this momentous victory for Spain, preventing the triumph of the insurgents of the Ten Years' War, hindering the arrival of an important shipment of arms, ammunition and men. From a tactical point of view, he prepared to board the Virginius Ship and with only 10 sailors under his command, he took 165 prisoners, including the President-elect of Cuba and the General-in-Chief of the Cuban Army and two Major Generals of the Cuban Army.

In 1878 after 13 years of service in the Spanish Navy, he decided to join the Mexican Navy, wanting to return to Mexico after having contributed to the Spanish Navy. After seven months of service in the Mexican Navy, he was appointed to the position of Chief of the Department of the Navy, a position he held for six years. Likewise, after having finished the position of Chief of the Department of the Navy between 1895 and 1905, he served as Chief of the Presidential General Staff. In 1902 he recovered the town of Bacalar that the Mayans had occupied, during the Caste War of Yucatán. He was, for all this, an important person in the naval field of the Navy and Merchant Navy in Mexico.

== Mexican Revolution ==
He was called by President Francisco I. Madero who appointed him magistrate proprietor of the Supreme Military Court, just when a conspiracy was organized against President Madero by the porfiristas Manuel Mondragón, Félix Díaz and Bernardo Reyes, who although they were in jail, they were able to organize a conspiracy of this magnitude with the help of the American ambassador Henry Lane Wilson, escaping from jail and apprehending Gustavo A. Madero and the Minister of War, Ángel García Peña, they seized the National Palace that General Lauro Villar Ochoa and Ángel Ortiz Monasterio defended entrenched in the name of the Maderista government where they achieved victory, however General Lauro Villar was wounded and Madero had deal with Victoriano Huerta, who during the Ten Tragic Days deceived the troops of Vice Admiral Ortiz Monasterio by simulating a false war, which would end with the death of Francisco I. Madero and José María Pino Suárez and killed by Aureliano Blanquet, with which Vice Admiral Ortiz-Monasterio refused to recognize Huerta's government, for which he was apprehended.

He was a member of the Military Judicial Power, in addition to being commander of the Zaragoza Corvette School, which was the first training ship in Mexico, and also made the first circumnavigation trip made by a Mexican Navy ship. He decided to participate in Mexican politics; launching himself as a deputy to the Congress of the Union (from September 16, 1882 to September 15, 1908), having belonged to Legislatures XI, XII, XIII, XIV, XV, XVI, XVII, XX, XXI, XXII and XXIII, occupying the direction of War and Navy. He finally died on March 28, 1922.

=== Burial ===
Ortiz Monasterio was buried in the Spanish Pantheon in Mexico City; however, in a campaign promoted by the Secretariat of the Navy and by the PAN senator Sebastián Calderón Centeno, it is being discussed whether or not his remains should be transferred to the Rotonda de las Personas Ilustres.

== Bibliography ==
- vicealm_angel_ortiz_monasterio.pdf
