= Gustavo A. Madero =

Mexican politician (1875–1913)

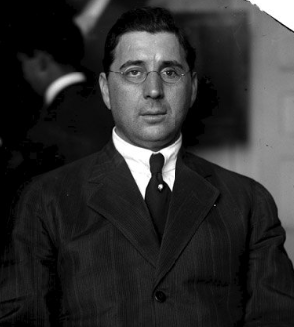
- Madero in 1912

Member of the Chamber of Deputies for Coahuila′s 2nd district
- In office 16 September 1912 – 18 February 1913
- Preceded by: Eliezer Espinosa
- Succeeded by: Salvador Benavides

Personal details
- Born: 16 January 1875 Parras de la Fuente, Coahuila, Mexico
- Died: 18 February 1913 (aged 38) Mexico City, Mexico
- Cause of death: Assassination
- Party: Progressive Constitutionalist
- Education: HEC Paris

Gustavo Adolfo Madero González (16 January 1875 – 18 February 1913), born in Parras de la Fuente, Coahuila, Mexico, was a participant in the Mexican Revolution against Porfirio Díaz along with other members of his wealthy family. He was also known as "Ojo Parado" ("staring eye") since he had one glass eye.

Madero's brother, Francisco I. Madero, was president of Mexico from 1911 to 1913. During the coup d'état in Mexico City known as Ten Tragic Days, Gustavo Madero was arrested, released to followers of conspirator Félix Díaz. A mob tortured him, pulling out his "good" eye, and then eventually killing him.

The Gustavo A. Madero, D.F. borough in Mexico City is named after him.

== Early life ==
Born as one of fifteen children on January 16, 1875, in Parras de la Fuente, located between Torreón and Saltillo in the state of Coahuila, Gustavo Madero grew up in one of the richest families of Mexico. The Madero family had settled in Northern Mexico in the early nineteenth century. Grandfather Evaristo had founded the Compañía Industrial de Parras. In the latter part of the nineteenth century the Madero family business extended from vineyards, cotton, and textiles, to mining, milling, smelting, ranching, and banking. Gustavo went to high school at the Colegio San Juan, a Jesuit school in Saltillo. For further high school studies and to learn English, the two oldest Madero brothers, Gustavo and Francisco attended Mount St. Mary's College in Emmitsburg, Maryland but stayed only for a year. In 1887, made possible with the financial support of his father, Gustavo and his older brother Francisco moved to France where they attended the Lycee of Versailles and finally received a baccalaureate. Gustavo went on to study business management at HEC in Paris. After the two brothers settled back in Mexico, Gustavo joined Francisco as confidante and chief of staff for a run at the presidency of Mexico.

== Mexican Revolution ==
There were many divisions within the Madero family; some of its members wished for a peace agreement, hoping to avoid the problems that the civil war would bring to their businesses and investments. Talks were arranged in New York with José Yves Limantour, the finance minister of the Díaz government, but these failed as the revolution continued and peace negotiations broke down.

Financing his brother's revolution required serious funding. Gustavo through family contacts went to New York in 1910. His main contact was the Washington lawyer and lobbyist Sherburne Hopkins. For a fee of $50,000 Gustavo signed him on to represent and promote the revolutionary movement his brother Francisco led against the Dictator Porfirio Díaz. Hopkins brought the New York financiers Henry Clay Pierce and Charles Ranlett Flint on board. Both had financial interest in the Mexican railroads and oil. Their main competitors, John D. Rockefeller of Standard Oil and Viscount Cowdray of the El Aguila Oil Company supported the Diaz regime. Thus, in the spring of 1911, the rivalry between international oil barons and the help of Sherburne Hopkins allowed Gustavo to raise the funds needed to depose the aging dictator of Mexico.

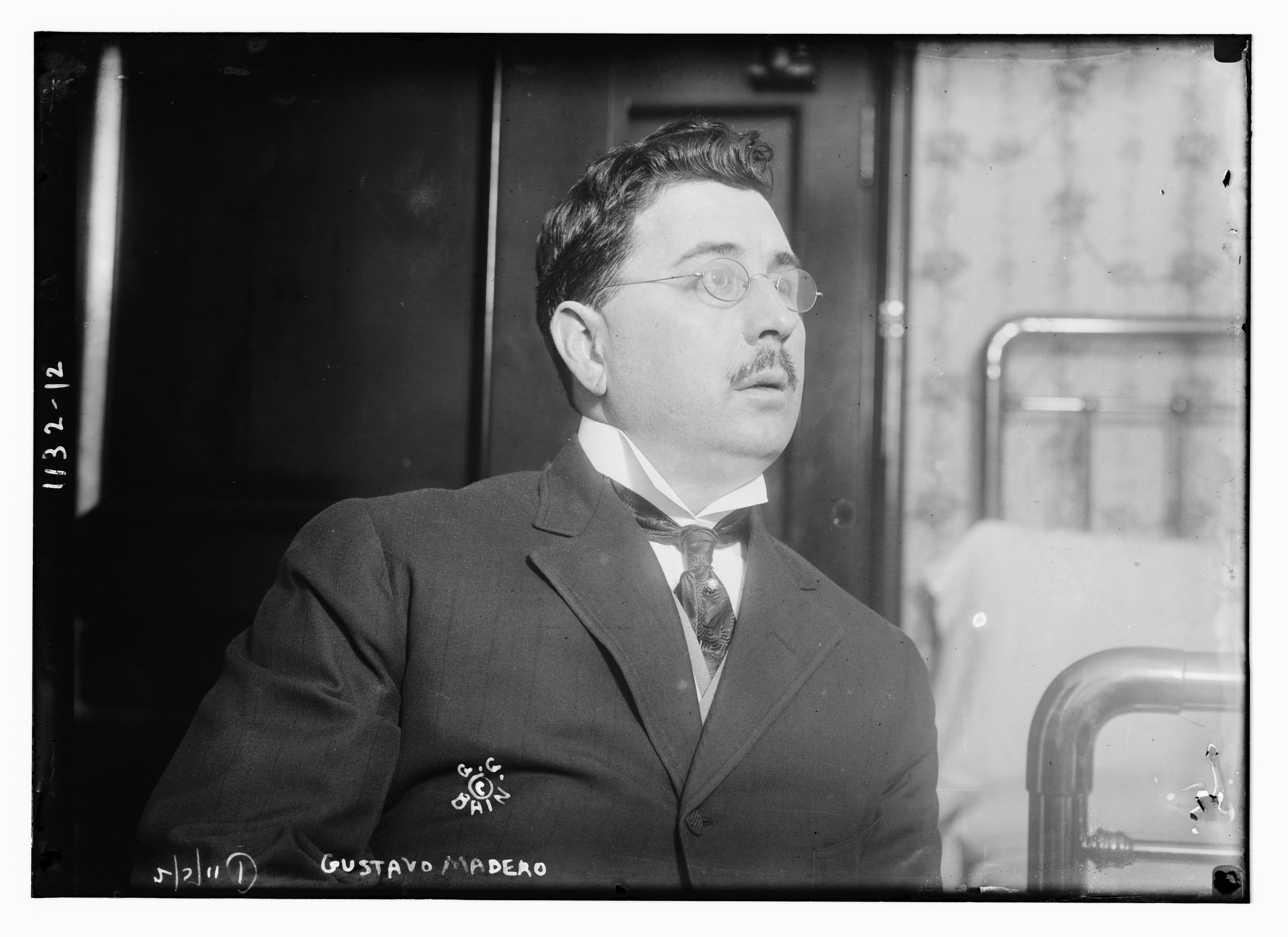
Gustavo Madero in 1911

After the success of the revolution, Gustavo remained his brother's closest confidante, although he did not hold public office. One of the most important tools of Gustavo's power between May 1911 and February 1913 was the Mexican Secret Service which he headed. Originally established and financed by Sherburne Hopkins, Gustavo through his lieutenant Felix A. Sommerfeld put down the most serious challenges to Francisco Madero's government. In the fall of 1911, Bernardo Reyes, an exiled general and competitor for the presidency in 1910, rose in revolt from San Antonio, Texas. The uprising fizzled by Christmas and Reyes was arrested. A few months later, another disgruntled revolutionary, Pascual Orozco who had fought alongside Madero to defeat Díaz, challenged the government in a massive uprising that covered much of northern Mexico. Again, Gustavo sent Sommerfeld to the border. The Mexican secret service cooperated closely with agents of the American Bureau of Investigations, customs and military officials to put down the uprising. Another uprising in Veracruz in the fall of 1912, this time headed by Felix Diaz, a relative of the deposed dictator, also fell victim to the efficient secret service under Gustavo's control. In the process, however, Gustavo made many serious enemies. Felix Díaz and Bernardo Reyes plotted their next moves from their jail cells. Victoriano Huerta, the army chief who the Mexican president fired for disloyalty on Gustavo's advice, seethed with resentment.

== The Ten Tragic Days ==
In February 1913, the final push of the reactionary forces to oust the democratically elected Mexican government took shape. Felix Díaz, Bernardo Reyes and a host of members of the old regime plotted to take control of Mexico City first and then the entire country. As the assault started on February 9, Reyes and Díaz marched on the presidential palace. In a shootout with troops Gustavo had frantically assembled in the early morning hours, Reyes was killed. Madero's secretary of war Lauro Villar Ochoa was seriously injured. The president appointed Victoriano Huerta, who professed undivided loyalty to Madero to replace him. However, Gustavo quickly uncovered the participation of Huerta in the conspiracy. On February 17, he arrested Huerta and brought him before the president. Against Gustavo's advice, Huerta remained in charge of the military. The Madero government collapsed the next day. On February 18 the American ambassador Henry Lane Wilson, Victoriano Huerta and Félix Díaz signed an agreement cementing the coup d'état, titled the Pact of the Embassy. Gustavo was ambushed and arrested inside the Gambrinus restaurant just before lunch. Two hours later, President Francisco Madero became a prisoner of the putschists.

Followers of Díaz sought to have Francisco and Gustavo Madero turned over to them. The President was kept by Huerta, since his resignation from the presidency was needed to give a veneer of legality to the coup d'etat. Gustavo Madero was turned over and taken to the arsenal of the Ciudadela. That night Gustavo was set upon and brutally murdered by a mob of over a hundred federal soldiers on the orders Manuel Mondragón, the new government's secretary of war. The mob desecrated Madero's body, extracting his glass eye and passing it around. News of Gustavo's death was kept from the President, as the usurpers pressured him to resign.

Gustavo had been Francisco Madero's closest advisor. "As the go-to person [for the president] he endured endless accusations of influence peddling and bribery... Besides the alleged corruptibility of Gustavo, the complaint alluded to the power of the President's brother."

== References in popular culture ==
- Gustavo Madero and his brother Francisco are mentioned in Cormac McCarthy's 1992 novel All the Pretty Horses: Alejandra's great-aunt recounts her ill-fated romantic relationship with a young Gustavo, and the two brothers' betrayal and execution.
- Gustavo Madero appears as a character in James Carlos Blake's 1996 novel The Friends of Pancho Villa.

== See also ==
- Emilio Madero, his brother
