= Rosendo Amor Esparza =

Mexican surgeon and medical researcher (1879–1970)

Rosendo Amor Esparza (1 March 1879, Villa de Guadalupe Zacatecas, Mexico – 20 January 1970) was a Mexican surgeon and medical researcher, better known in his time as the "Prince of Surgeons" for pioneering multiple surgical procedures such as the introduction of "Raquianestesia" in Mexico in the early XX century

== Studies ==
From 1893 to 1897, he went to High School at Escuela Nacional Preparatoria in Mexico City. From 1898 to 1904, he studied at the National School of Medicine (Today Facultad de Medicina de la UNAM) and graduated as Doctor in Medicine. From 1925 to 1927, he went to in Europe and at the same time, to search advances of hospitals in France, Germany, Austria, and Hungary , resident in Paris

== Professional Activity ==
He was the director of the National School of Medicine from 1916 to 1920. He taught the subject of "Chirurgical Clinic". He later became director of the department of gynecology at the "Hospital General de Mexico" (General Hospital of Mèxico). From 1933 to 1938, he was the director of the Hospital Español (Spanish Hospital). In 1938, he became President of the National Academy of Medicine, serving two terms. He was President of the National Health Commission and Senator of the Republic during the term of President of Mèxico Venustiano Carranza, he resigned from the Senate for lack of interest, dedicating his energy to medical science. He served as a councilman in Mexico City.

In 1911, he was President of the White Neutral Cross, the first Human Rights organization in Mèxico and intervened to stop the massacre in the political crisis named "Decena Tràgica" that culminated with the assassination of president of Mexico, Francisco I Madero.

Passionate about bullfights, he became chief surgeon in the National Bullring "El Toreo" in Mexico City, where he saved many bullfighters; he later retired and passed the post to surgeon Rojo de la Vega. His last gold medal was given to him days before he died, by Mexican President Gustavo Diaz Ordaz.

In 1972, President Luis Echeverria Alvarez created the "Rosendo Amor Esparza" Medal, to be given by the Secretary of Health to distinguished medical scientists and doctors. Due to the fact that he was born in the state of Zacatecas, on November 15, 1954, the city counsel of the state capital, in the presence of the state governor, declared him: "Illustrious son of the city of Guadalupe Zacatecas".
