= Pact of the Embassy =

The Pact of the Embassy, also known as the Pact of the Ciudadela, is a February 19, 1913, agreement brokered by U.S. Ambassador to Mexico Henry Lane Wilson during the coup to oust democratically-elected Mexican President Francisco I. Madero. Wilson had opposed Madero's government from its beginning and had done everything he could to undermine it. In a period of the Mexican Revolution known as the Ten Tragic Days ("Decena Trágica"), forces opposed to Madero had bombarded the center of Mexico City with artillery fire, with the loss of civilian life and destruction of buildings. Madero's chief military man, General Victoriano Huerta, put up a desultory effort to combat the rebels, which some see as a "phony war."

Ambassador Wilson brought together the two rival generals whose forces were responsible for the destruction, Huerta, head of the Mexican Federal Army, in whom Madero had misplaced his trust, and General Félix Díaz, nephew of former Mexican President Porfirio Díaz. Wilson aimed to broker an agreement to end the bloody violence, which several historians see as the pretext for the ouster of Madero. Huerta changed his allegiance and was now plotting to oust Madero. The pact terms were that Díaz would recognize Huerta as provisional president of Mexico, with Huerta allowing Díaz to name Huerta's cabinet, presumably with his supporters. They further agreed that rather than holding quick elections, they would delay them, and Huerta would support Díaz's candidacy.

They reached an agreement while Madero remained president of Mexico, but the U.S. ambassador's actions strongly influenced Madero's decision to resign. According to Ambassador Wilson's memoirs, he took the action without consultation, seeing the U.S. embassy as neutral ground for the rival generals. Backed by the U.S. ambassador, the signed agreement persuaded President Madero and Vice President José María Pino Suárez to resign. They were arrested and expected to go into exile, as former President Porfirio Díaz had done in May 1911. However, the two men were murdered during their transfer from the National Palace to Lecumberri National Penitentiary. Once in power, Huerta reneged on his agreement with Díaz for power-sharing and elections. Díaz went into exile, and the elections promised in the pact never occurred.

== See also ==
- United States involvement in the Mexican Revolution
