= Ángel García Peña =

Mexican general

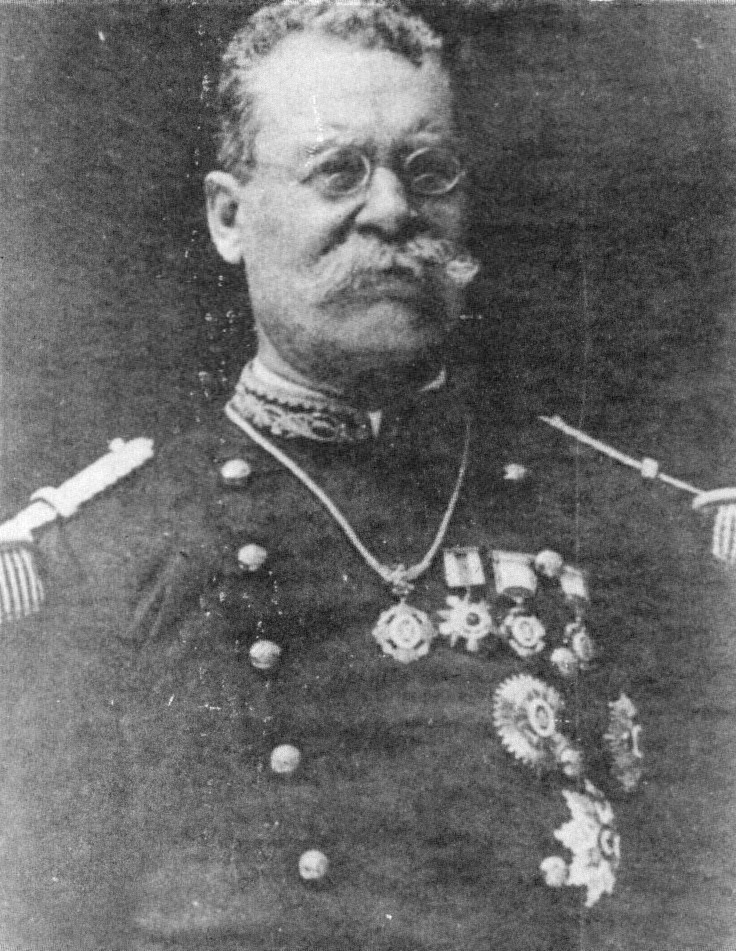

Secretary of War and Navy of Mexico
- In office March 6, 1912 – February 9, 1913
- President: Francisco I. Madero
- Vice President: José María Pino Suárez
- Preceded by: José González Salas
- Succeeded by: Manuel Mondragón

Personal details
- Born: 1856 Chihuahua City, Chihuahua, Mexico
- Died: November 23, 1928 (aged 71–72) Mexico City, Mexico
- Education: Heroic Military Academy

Military service
- Allegiance: Porfiriato; Maderistas
- Branch: Mexican Army
- Years of service: 1872 - 1913; 1914; 1916 - 1920
- Rank: Major General
- Battles/wars: Mexican Revolution: Ten Tragic Days (WIA); United States occupation of Veracruz

Ángel García Peña (1856 – November 23, 1928) was a Mexican Major General who served the Maderistas during the Mexican Revolution with his most notable role being in the Ten Tragic Days.

== Biography ==
He was born in the city of Chihuahua City, Chihuahua in 1856, being the son of Rodrigo García and Guadalupe Peña. On January 2, 1872, he entered the Heroic Military Academy, and on December 4 of 1875 was promoted to the rank of second lieutenant of artillery and two years later in 1877, artillery lieutenant. Little by little he rose and in September 1878 he was part of the General Staff of the 3rd Division; and in 1879, with the rank of captain first, he passed to the Department of the General Staff.

In 1880, he was promoted to Major and in 1882 he worked as an assistant to the National Astronomical Observatory at the Equatorial Telescope to study the transit of Venus and in the following year, he was appointed a member of the commission that was in charge of discussing the Statistical Regulations. In 1884 the rank of lieutenant colonel was recognized and from July 25 to August 30, 1887, and accompanied by General Sóstenes Rocha and participated in the Scientific Commission of Sonora, which was in charge of surveying the Yaqui River; later he was appointed director of said commission. For several years he participated in the Exploratory Geographical Commission, of which he was director from 1902 to 1912. He also provided his services to the National Artillery Foundry.

García Peña had an active participation in the campaigns against the Yaquis that were carried out from 1887 to 1901 and commanded the 11th Battalion of the Mexican National Guard and was head of column in several explorations in the mountains. He also served as inspector of the staff of the first, second and third military zones. For his outstanding performance in the Yaqui War on March 19, 1900, García Peña obtained the honorable mention and on April 16 of the same year, was awards the Decoration of 3rd. Class of the Order of Military Merit. In 1904 he was promoted to Brigadier General.

In 1910 and 1911 he fought the Maderistas in Chihuahua, and after the fall of the Porfiriato he was promoted to brigadier general on September 12, 1911, by agreement of the interim president Francisco León de la Barra. In February 1912 he was commissioned to organize an Auxiliary Irregular Battalion of the Federation in Jalapa and Veracruz and on March 5 received from Francisco I. Madero the Secretary of War and Navy in his presidential cabinet. In 1912 the King of Spain, Alfonso XIII, awarded General García Peña the Grand Cross of Military Merit and on September 11 of that same year he received the rank of general of division.

When the events known as the Ten Tragic Days unleashed, García Peña faced the uprising and on February 9, he attempted to evict a group of rebels who were in the National Palace, but was wounded during the fighting as he was shot through the arm.

Upon the triumph of Victoriano Huerta's squads, he requested his retirement from active service, which was granted on March 1, 1913. At that time, García Peña dedicated himself to carrying out private surveying works, but when in April 1914 the government of Huerta sent for him on the notice of the United States occupation of Veracruz, he immediately left in command of a division of five thousand men heading for Perote in order to fight the Americans but was defeated in the battle.

When the danger of war dissipated, García Peña again requested his retirement from active service, which this time was granted on July 9, 1914; and during the government of Venustiano Carranza he returned to serve as a military man from 1916 to January 1920, when he permanently retired from arms. García Peña died on November 23, 1928, in Mexico City.
