= Gregorio Ruiz =

- Born: September 7, 1844; Perote, Veracruz
- Died: February 9, 1913; Mexico City
- Relatives: artist/poet
- Military career
- Allegiance: Mexico
- Service years: 1862–1913
- Rank: General
- Conflicts: French Intervention in Mexico, Mexican Revolution

Gregorio Ruiz (Perote, Veracruz, September 7, 1844 – Mexico City, February 9, 1913) was a Mexican general who participated in the Mexican Revolution.

== Biography ==
He was born in 1844 and he died in 1913. He studied at the Heroico Colegio Militar, and by 1864 was a lieutenant of auxiliaries in the Mexican Army. He fought against the French Intervention in Mexico and ensuing empire of Maximilian I of Mexico (1862–1867). He participated in the pacification campaigns of Puebla and Oaxaca in 1876, and in Tepic and Sinaloa in 1877 and 1888.

With more than 35 years of service, he was discharged from the Army in 1911. He reached the rank of general. The following year he was elected federal deputy for Monclova, State of Coahuila.

Ruiz was a leading conspirator in Ten Tragic Days, a ten-day massacre and revolt against President Francisco I. Madero. Early on in the fighting, Ruiz and several subordinates were captured and executed by federal troops.
His death is primarily attributed to President Madero; however, there is insufficient evidence to support this. Another school of historians maintains that General Victoriano Huerta was responsible, arguing that he sought to silence General Ruiz after learning of his agreement with the rebels. Others claim that Madero's cabinet gave the order. None of these three accusations has conclusive proof.
