= Manuel Mondragón =

Mexican politician

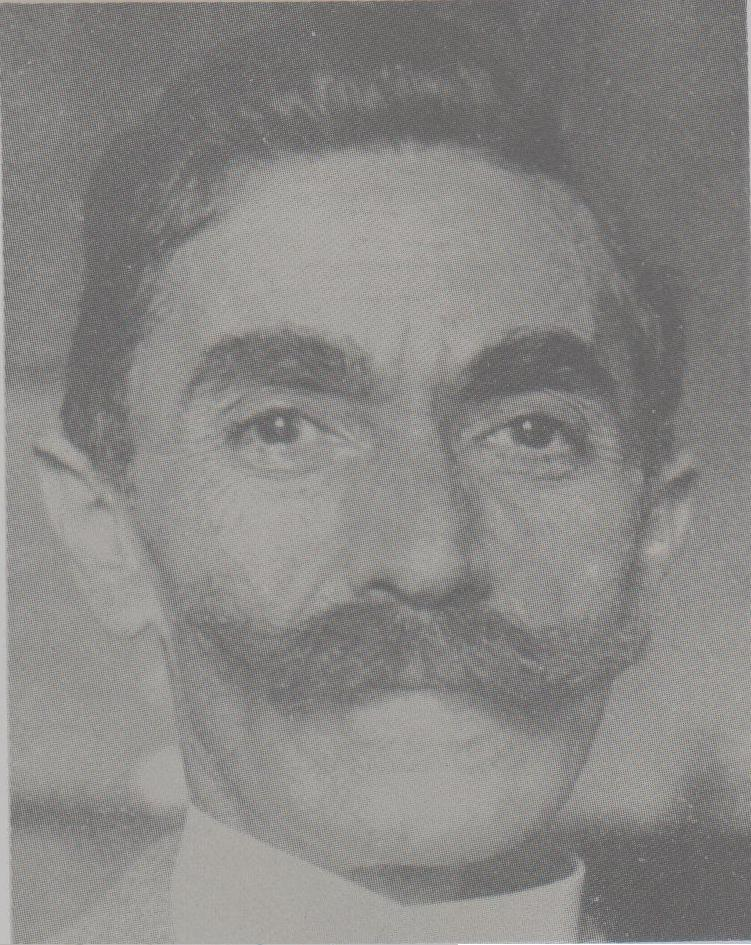
- Mondragón in 1918
- Born: Manuel Mondragón Montenegro; 1859; Ixtlahuaca, State of Mexico
- Died: 1922 (aged 63) San Sebastián, Spain
- Allegiance: Mexico
- Service years: 1880–1914
- Rank: General de División
- Commands: Secretario de Guerra y Marina
- Conflicts: Mexican Revolution
- Awards: Légion d'honneur
- Spouse: Mercedes Valseca
- Children: 8, including Carmen Mondragón

Manuel Mondragón Montenegro (1859–1922) was a Mexican military officer who played a prominent role in the Mexican Revolution. He graduated from the Mexican Military Academy as an artillery officer in 1880. He designed the world's first gas-operated semi-automatic rifle, the M1908 rifle, and a 75mm howitzer. General Mondragón was the father of a model, artist and poet Carmen Mondragón, better known as Nahui Ollin.

== Porfiriato ==
As an adolescent Mondragón entered the Military Academy of Chapultepec, where he specialised in artillery. Upon finishing his studies, he worked developing military materiel. He modified the French 75mm howitzer, earning a name for himself among Porfirist military circles. He perfected a repeating rifle and a 75mm howitzer (the Saint-Chamond-Mondragón), both of which still bear his name. In 1904 he wrote a manual Description and employment of the instruments for preparing and executing fires, and in 1910 Description of rapid-fire 75mm materiel. In 1907 he was named Director of the Department of Artillery.

He initiated a project on military organic law, based on mandatory military service, and as professor of the Military Academy released a work in 1910 entitled Defense of the Coasts. The artillery at the ports of Salina Cruz on the Pacific and Puerto México on the Gulf are due to his efforts.

As a military officer during the Porfiriato, he worked against the Maderista movement. In September 1911, he took leave from the Federal Army, but in 1913 returned, reincorporated in the army to support Gregorio Ruiz in the anti-Maderista rebellion of the Decena trágica.

== Mexican Revolution ==
At the side of General Bernardo Reyes and General Félix Díaz, Mondragón assisted in the start of the coup, known as the Ten Tragic Days, against democratically-elected President of Mexico Francisco I. Madero in February 1913. He allied with General Victoriano Huerta. When Huerta seized the presidency, Mondragón was named Secretary of War and the Navy. He served in this position only a short time, resigning in June amid accusations from prominent Huertist politicians and public opinion blaming him for the advance of revolutionary forces opposed to Huerta's regime due to his incompetence and poor planning in the campaign against them.

Following these accusations, Huerta expelled Mondragón from Mexico in July 1913, based on the rumor of Mondragón's involvement in a plot to overthrow him. Mondragón left for Spain, where the government of France awarded him the Légion d'honneur. He died in exile in San Sebastián in 1922.

== Bibliography ==
- Francisco Naranjo. Diccionario biográfico Revolucionario. Imprenta Editorial "Cosmos", Mexico, 1935. ISBN 968-805-293-0.
