= Lauro Villar Ochoa =

Mexican military general

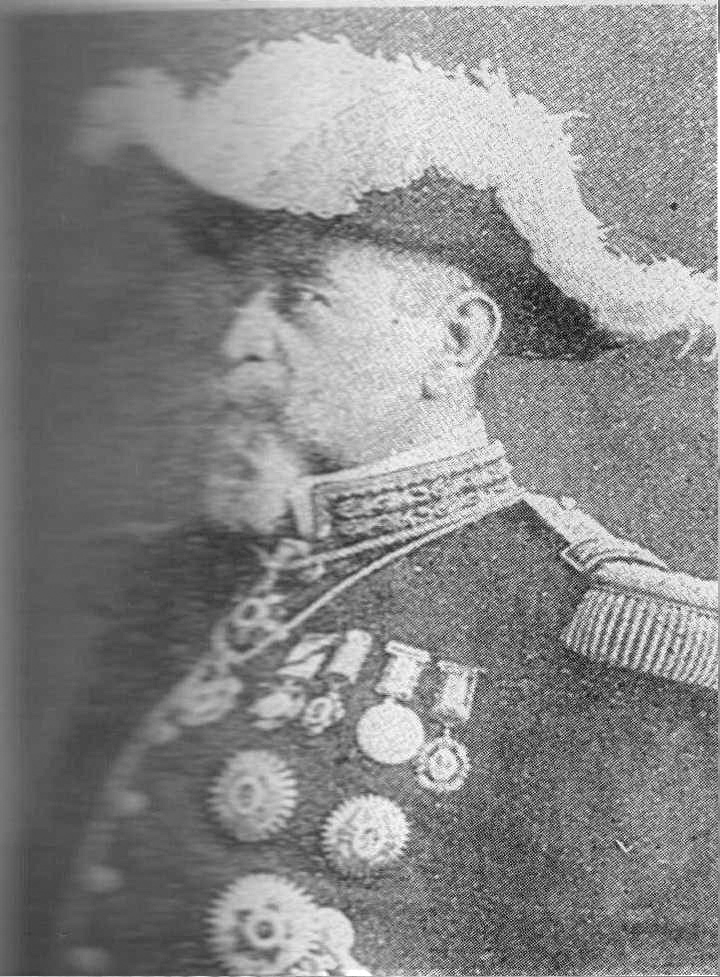
- General Lauro Villar
- Born: August 6, 1849; Matamoros, Tamaulipas, Mexico
- Died: June 26, 1923 (aged 73); Mexico City, Mexico
- Organization: Mexican Army

Lauro Villar Ochoa (August 6, 1849- June 26, 1923) was a Mexican military general who is known for defending the National Palace of Mexico and Francisco I. Madero's administration, along with Ángel Ortiz Monasterio, from the rebellious attacks of the general Bernardo Reyes of the Ten Tragic Days in 1913. He also fought in the French Intervention and against the empire of Maximilian I of Mexico.

== Biography ==
Lauro Villar was born in the city of Matamoros, Tamaulipas. He enlisted in the military at the young age of 15, and due to his potential, Villar reached the rank of second lieutenant in 1865, just a year after his enlistment. Years later, in 1911, he assumed the position of Divisional General. In addition, Villar led a defense to protect his hometown of Matamoros and the city of Querétaro during the French Intervention, and also combated the forces of the empire of Maximilian I of Mexico. Throughout his military career, Villar served loyalty to the following presidents of Mexico: Benito Juárez, Sebastián Lerdo de Tejada, Porfirio Díaz, Francisco León de la Barra, Francisco I. Madero and Victoriano Huerta.
