= Ten Tragic Days =

1913 coup d'état during the Mexican Revolution

- Part of the Mexican Revolution
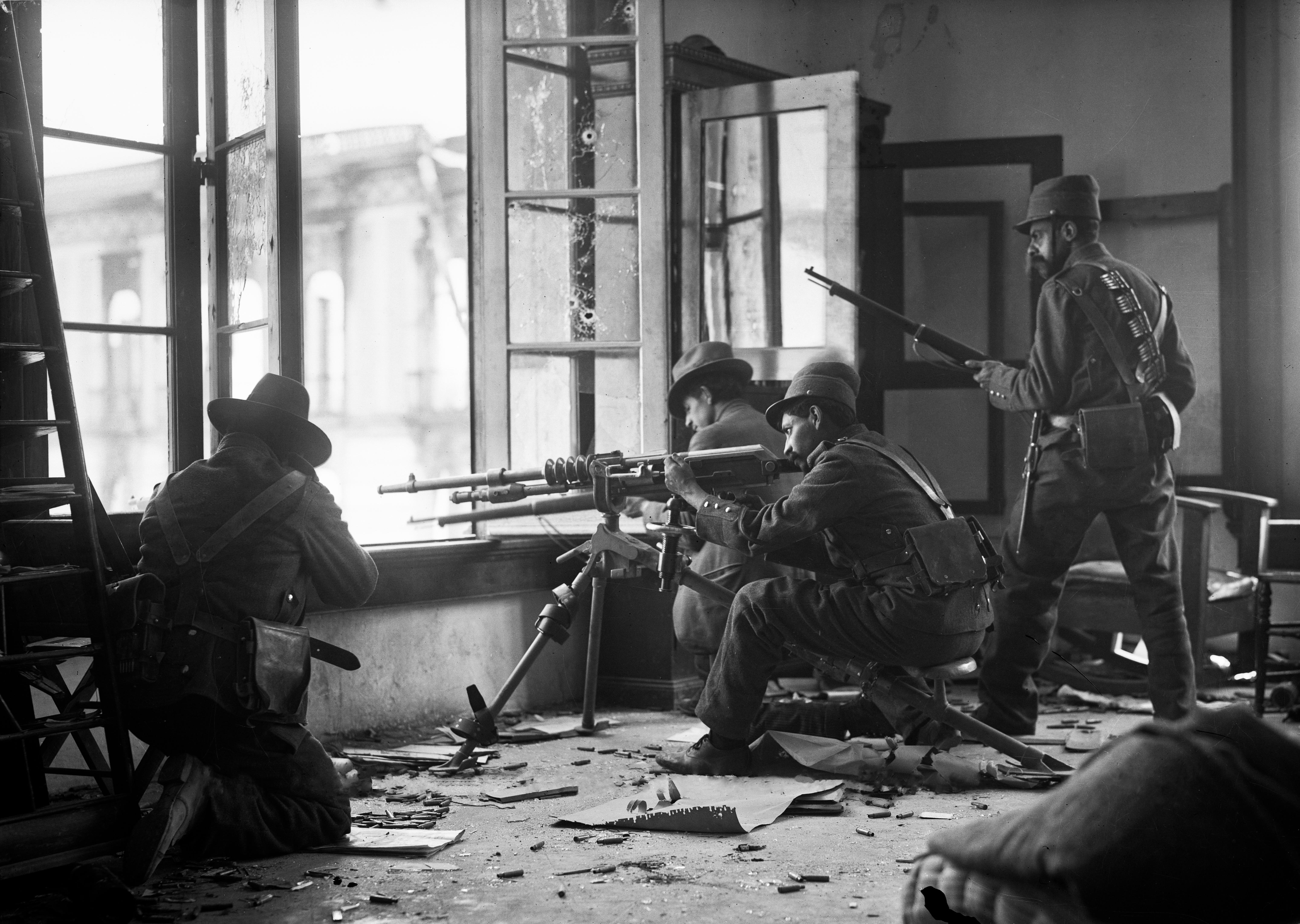
- Rebel followers of Félix Díaz in the Mexico City YMCA during the coup against Madero
Date	9–19 February 1913
Location	Mexico City
Result	Rebel victory: Assassination of President Francisco I. Madero, and his Vice President, José María Pino Suárez; Victoriano Huerta seizes the presidency

Belligerents
(Loyalists); Maderistas	(Rebels); Porfiristas; Reyistas; Felicistas; Supported by: United States; Germany

Commanders and leaders
Francisco I. Madero; Lauro Villar; Ángel Ortiz Monasterio; Victoriano Huerta (9-16 February); Ángel García Peña (WIA); Felipe Ángeles	Félix Díaz; Bernardo Reyes †; Manuel Mondragón; Aureliano Blanquet; Gregorio Ruiz †; Victoriano Huerta (16-19 February) (United States) Henry Lane Wilson

Casualties and losses
5,500 dead	
- Victoriano Huerta switched from pro-Madero to anti-Madero during the fighting

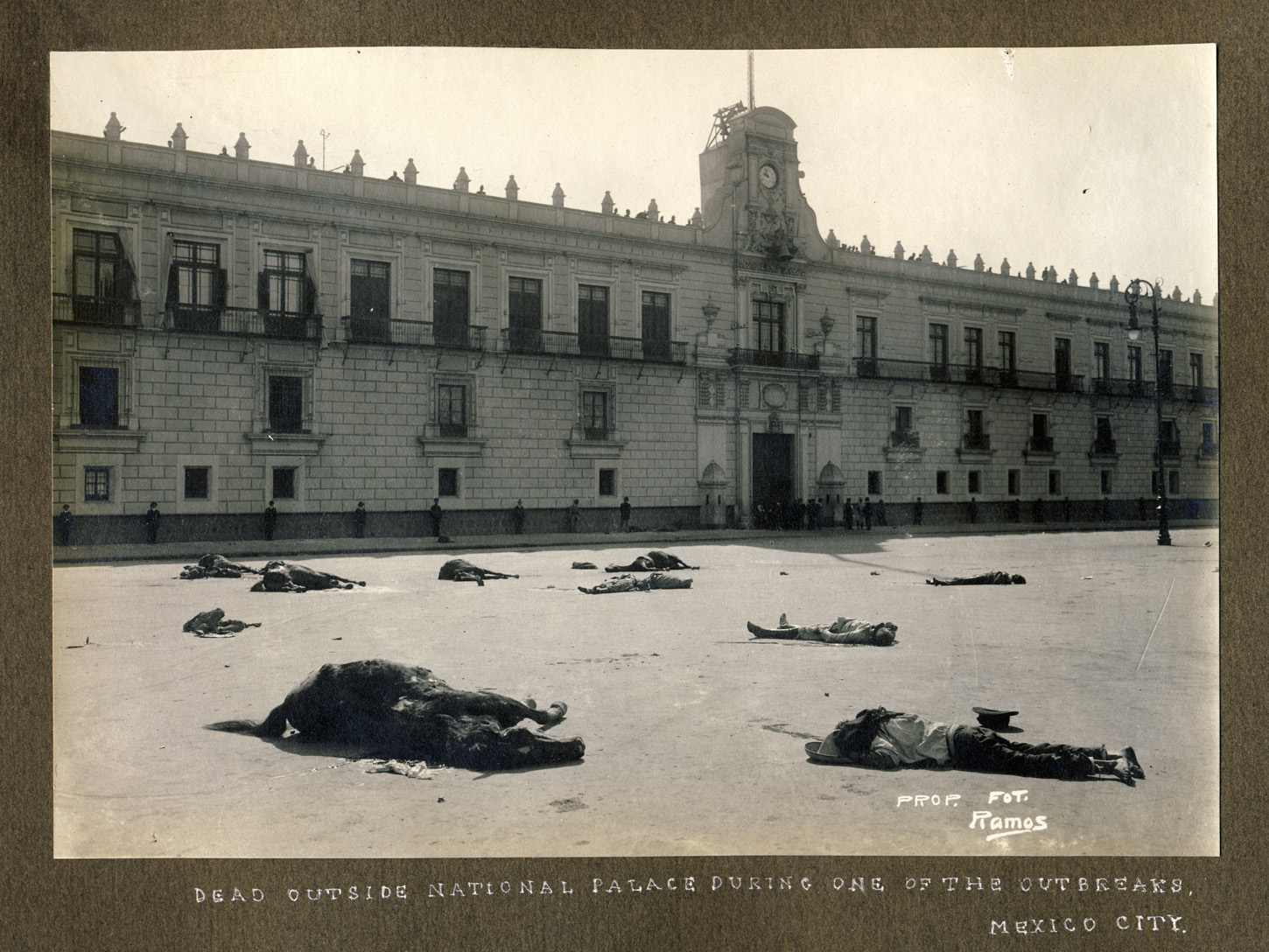
The National Palace, a target of the rebel artillery fire. There were dead bodies in the Zócalo and the capital's streets.

The Ten Tragic Days (Spanish: La Decena Trágica) is the name given to the multi-day coup d'état during the Mexican Revolution in Mexico City. It was staged by opponents of Francisco I. Madero, the democratically elected president of Mexico, between 9–19 February 1913. The coup instigated a second phase of the Mexican Revolution, after dictator Porfirio Díaz had been ousted and replaced in elections by Francisco I. Madero. The coup was carried out by general Victoriano Huerta and supporters of the old regime, with support from the United States, especially U.S. ambassador Henry Lane Wilson.

In the ten days of violence, the aim was to "create the illusion of chaos necessary to induce Madero to step down" from the presidency. Rebels led by General Félix Díaz, nephew of ex-president Porfirio Díaz, and General Bernardo Reyes escaped from jail and rallied forces to overthrow President Francisco I. Madero. The coup was strongly supported by U.S. Ambassador to Mexico Henry Lane Wilson, who was implacably opposed to Madero. Madero had retained the Mexican Federal Army after rebels had forced the resignation of President Porfirio Díaz. The head of the Mexican Federal Army, General Victoriano Huerta, ostensibly the defender of the Madero government, defected to the rebels, who sought the return of the old political order. On 18 February the sitting president and vice president were captured by rebel General Aureliano Blanquet, effectively ending Madero's presidency. On 19 February, a dispute between General Díaz and General Huerta about who should head the provisional government was resolved by Ambassador Wilson mediating between the two in an in-person meeting at the U.S. embassy. They formalized an agreement known as the Pact of the Embassy.

For ordinary citizens of Mexico City, the ten days of bombardment and displacement were horrific. While most fighting occurred between opposing military factions, assaulting or defending Madero's presidency, artillery and rifle fire inflicted substantial losses among uninvolved civilians and major damage to property in the capital's downtown. The February 19 pact between the two rebel generals put an end to the violence in Mexico City, and marks the end of the 10 days. But the political drama continued. While in custody, Madero and his vice president resigned, expecting that they would be allowed to go into exile, but they were subsequently murdered on 22 February 1913. General Huerta became President of Mexico, with the support of the U.S. and German ambassadors and most Mexican state governors.

After the coup came a third phase of the Mexican Revolution: civil war between Huerta's central government and the many revolutionary armies in northern and southern Mexico, who fought to take Huerta out of power and against one another. The newly inaugurated U.S. President Woodrow Wilson, in a change of mind of American foreign policy, refused to recognize Huerta's government. This phase concluded in 1917 after Constitutionalists gained control and drafted the Mexican Constitution of 1917.

== Ouster of Díaz and Madero presidency 1911-13 ==
Following uprisings in Mexico in the wake of the fraudulent presidential election of 1910, Porfirio Díaz resigned and went into exile in May 1911. A brief interim government under Francisco León de la Barra allowed for elections in October 1911, and Francisco I. Madero was elected President of Mexico. Madero, a member of one of Mexico's richest families, had never held elected office before, but had broad support of many sectors of Mexico. He was committed to constitutional democracy, rule of law, and separation of powers.

Within a few months, Madero began to lose support and came under criticism. Though Madero came from a wealthy background, the conservatives never forgave him for driving Porfirio Díaz out of office. Madero's supporters became disillusioned when he refused to implement their plans, such as the breakup of the large estates. Madero, at the end of his first year in the presidency, faced serious difficulties. The country was to a considerable extent unsettled, the treasury was depleted, and Madero's staff and supporters were only slightly less audacious than the hated Científicos, technocratic advisors, of the Porfirio Díaz's era.

During the first year of Madero's term, four revolts occurred. The Zapata revolt in Morelos, which began in November 1911, was contained by General Felipe Ángeles, but was not suppressed. The Pascual Orozco revolt in Chihuahua, begun in March 1912, and was handled by General Victoriano Huerta, but Orozco and his Colorados remained at large. The revolts of General Bernardo Reyes in Nuevo León, in December 1912 and General Félix Díaz in Veracruz, in November 1912, were crushed, and the two generals were imprisoned in Mexico City.

The two generals began plotting together to overthrow Madero and sought to bring in General Huerta, but they did not offer him enough incentives to join. Once the rebel uprising began, Huerta secretly joined the plot. U.S. Ambassador Henry Lane Wilson, the representative of President William Howard Taft's administration took an active role in undermining Madero's administration.

== The Ten Days ==
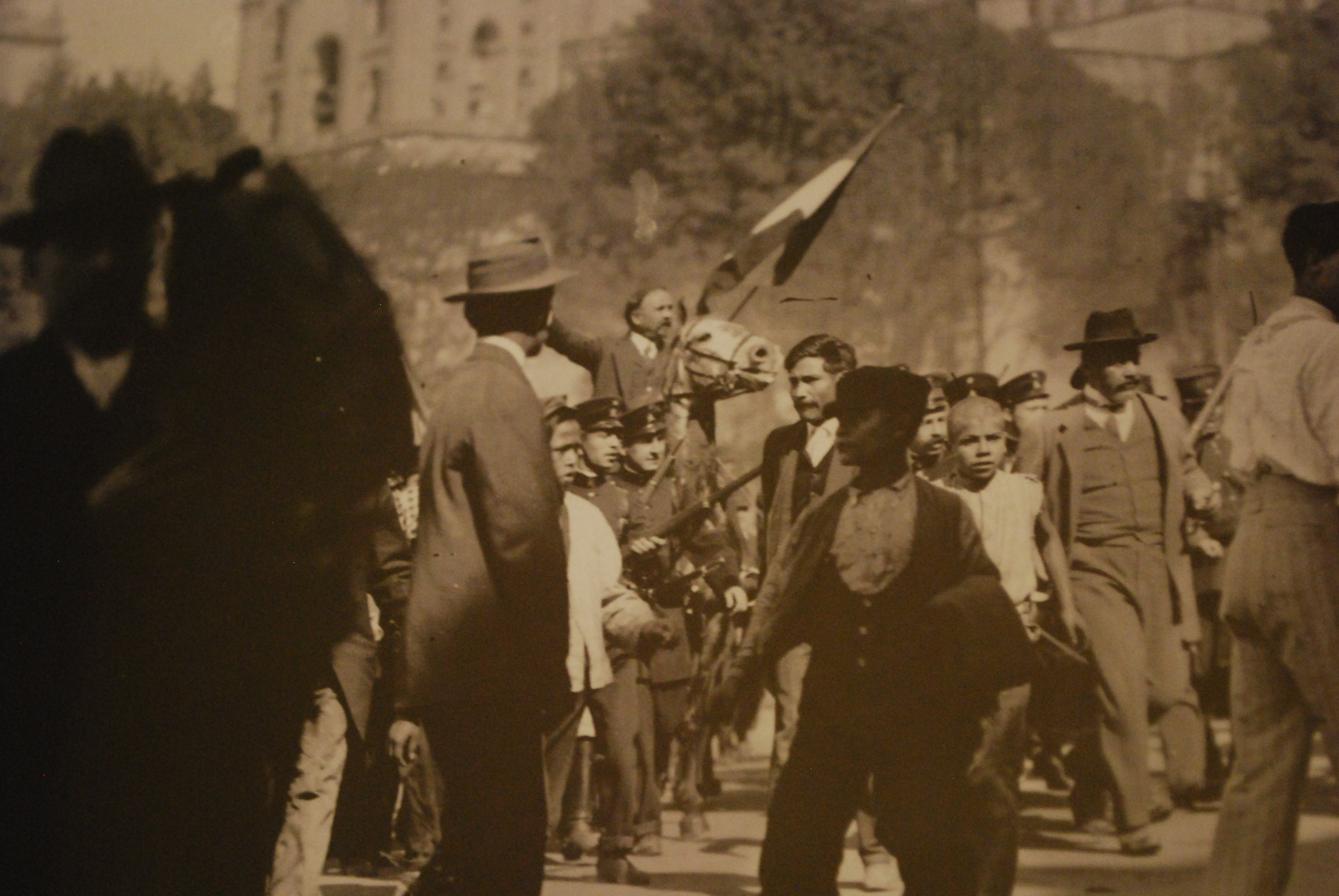
Francisco I Madero arriving on the first day of the Decena Tragica 9 February 1913. Photographer Gerónimo Hernández.

=== 9 February, the coup begins ===
Rumors of a pending overthrow of Madero were passed around openly in the capital, with only moderate enthusiasm. One vocal proponent of the removal of Madero was General Manuel Mondragón, who had accumulated finances under the Porfirio Díaz regime as an artillery expert, and was under suspicion of theft and corruption. Gathering the support of his officers and staff, he persuaded the cadets of the Escuela Militar de Aspirantes Military School located at Tlalpan to join him. The cadets appear to have acted under the direct orders of their instructors and senior commanders who were largely drawn from the conservative upper-class families of Mexican society, who supported a counter-revolution. They were joined by infantry and cavalry units of the regular army, from the Tlalpan garrison.

On February 9, 1913, the cadets entered the city in trolley cars. In the early morning, they gathered before the civilian penitentiary, where they demanded the release of General Félix Díaz. After a brief parley (the commander was killed), Díaz was freed. The cadets and soldiers under the leadership of their officers, proceeded to the Santiago Tlatelolco military prison, where they demanded and secured the release of General Reyes. When released, General Reyes mounted a horse and led part of the cadets and a column of soldiers to the National Palace, arriving there at 7:30 AM. Reyes appeared to have had full confidence that he would be welcomed and that the Palace would be delivered over to him. He rode to its gate "as if on parade". Reyes was fired upon, and fell from his horse mortally wounded; the men behind him scattered, and many spectators were killed in the confused shooting that followed. When the firing ceased 400 lay dead and over 1,000 were wounded; among them General Villar, the military commander. A bullet had cut through his collarbone. The Mexican Secretary of War, Ángel García Peña, was shot through the arm.

Pres. Madero was in the presidential residence at Chapultepec Castle, three miles away from the initial fighting. He received word of the coup at about 8 am. Madero mounted a horse and, with a small escort including the Secretaries of Finance and Treasury, rode into the city. Arriving at the end of the broad Avenida Juárez and finding the narrower streets thronged, he dismounted and went into a photographer's studio opposite the unfinished Teatro Nacional (National Theater), to telephone for later news. There he was joined by a few citizens and army officers, among them Victoriano Huerta, then on inactive duty due to an eye condition. Huerta had been considered in disfavor and was known to be resentful at not having been made Madero's Minister of War. Madero on his part had reservations about Huerta, an efficient but brutal officer with serious drinking problems.

Huerta offered his services to Madero, and, since General Villar and Secretary of War Peña were injured, his services were accepted. Huerta was appointed Commander of the Army of the Capital. The commission was made formal on the following day. (Note that Huerta was appointed the commander of the Army of the Capital, not the supreme commander of the Armies of Mexico, as is often reported.)

The President stepped out on a balcony of the National Palace and made a speech to the crowd, with Huerta standing by his side. Madero then went down, remounted his horse, and rode off, bowing to the cheering crowds, alone, far ahead of his escort, to the National Palace.

The assault on the Palace failed because Madero loyalist General Lauro Villar, the Commandant of the Palace Guard, walking in civilian clothes to his office in the early morning, observed a detachment of the cadets, dragging a machine gun with them, and thus was able to give the alarm and have his men in readiness. Madero left the presidential residence at Chapultepec Castle and with a contingent of cadets from the nearby military academy, left for the National Palace and encountered General Huerta. General Villar was wounded in the initial fighting and Madero offered the command of the palace guard to Huerta. However, Madero was not entirely confident of Huerta and left for Cuernavaca, to consult with General Felipe Angeles.

By this time, General Félix Díaz had heard about Reyes's death and contacted U.S. Ambassador Henry Lane Wilson. General Felix Díaz had been more successful than General Reyes. As a result of the resistance at the Presidential Palace, Diaz had retreated to the city arsenal, the Ciudadela, a few blocks from the Presidential Palace. He took control of the armory without much opposition, and found himself in possession of a defensible fort, with the government's reserve of arms and ammunition. From the ciudadela rebels began bombarding downtown Mexico City with their cannons, aiming for the National Palace.

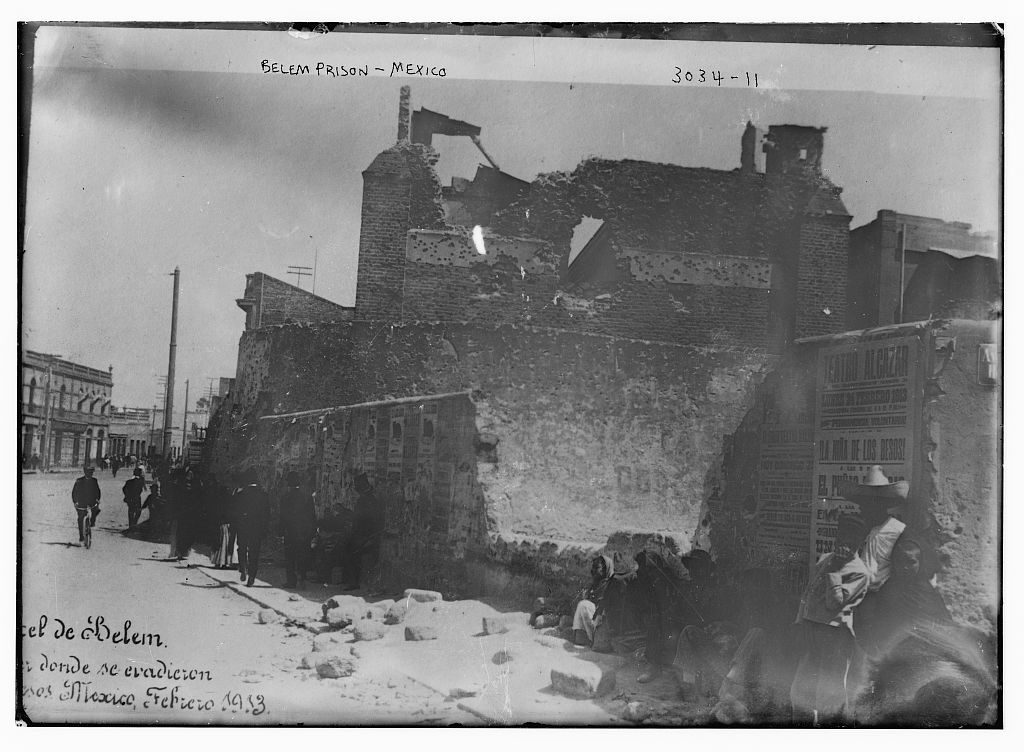
The Belem Prison, Mexico City following the fighting in Mexico City February 1913

That evening, Madero went to Cuernavaca, capital of the neighboring state of Morelos, where he conferred with Gen. Felipe Ángeles, then engaged against the forces of Zapata. He returned that night with General Ángeles and a train-load of arms, ammunition and some men, and with the understanding that General Ángeles would be placed in command of the capital army. By Monday morning, Madero had a force of one thousand men.

=== 10 February ===
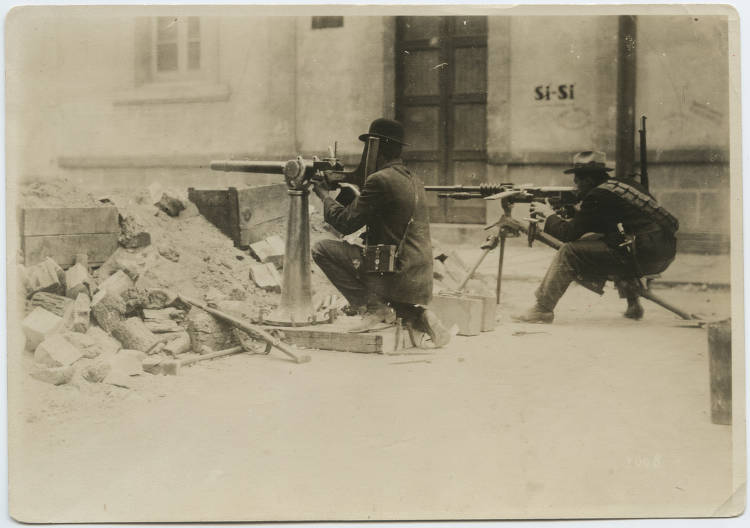
Rebels dressed in civilian clothing in action

On Monday, February 10, neither side made any significant moves; Madero had complete confidence that this revolt would be defeated, as had been the previous army revolts. Madero telegraphed General Aureliano Blanquet to move his 1,200 men from Toluca to the National Palace, a distance of roughly fifty miles. General Blanquet acknowledged that he was on the way.

Madero conferred with the Army staff and brought forward his idea that General Ángeles should command the Capital Army, but the staff objected, stating that technically, the recently promoted Ángeles was not yet a general, as Congress had not yet confirmed his appointment.

Former interim president Francisco León de la Barra offered his services to Madero to mediate between the president and the rebels, but Madero rebuffed the offer.

=== 11–12 February: bombardment of city ===
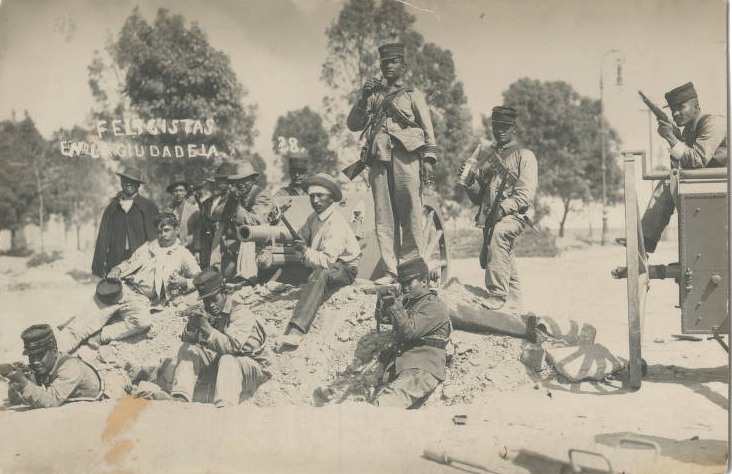
Civilian and military Felicistas (Felix Diaz supporters) in the Citadel district of Mexico City.

On February 11, at about 10 a.m., Huerta began the bombardment of the arsenal, which met with a vigorous rebel response, and the downtown between the National Palace and the arsenal was heavily damaged. Civilians were trapped in the eight-hours of crossfire. During the day, other government reinforcements arrived, along with a supply of ammunition, from Veracruz. Huerta, in charge of the guard of the National Palace, met with Félix Díaz in a private home in the Roma section of Mexico City. It was this meeting where Huerta declared his support for the coup. At this point, Huerta had not made his change of loyalty public. He then directed the 18th Corps of Rurales, the crack mounted police force commanded by the presidency, to exposed positions near the arsenal where they suffered heavy casualties under machine gun fire from the rebels. Whether the result of misjudgement or a deliberate betrayal, Huerta's action significantly weakened the forces loyal to Madero.

As the conflict unfolded, Governor of Coahuila, Venustiano Carranza offered Madero refuge in Saltillo. There was no movement of the mutineers from the arsenal, and no evidence of disaffection in the city at large. The U.S. ambassador, Henry Lane Wilson, however, on this day told all visitors at the Embassy that the Madero government had practically fallen and telegraphed Pres. William Howard Taft, asking for powers to force the combatants to negotiations. The mutual bombardment continued into the next day. Wilson conferred with the Spanish and German ministers and, as his report to the State Department that day stated, "protested against the continuance of hostilities." The President, continues Ambassador Wilson's report, "was visibly embarrassed and endeavored to fix the responsibility on General Félix Díaz."

Wilson now took the view that President Madero, by not surrendering instantly to the mutineers, was responsible for the bloodshed. This view was congenial to the Spanish Minister, and to it were won the British and German ministers. Ambassador Wilson said that he called into consultation, on this and subsequent occasions, only his British, Spanish and German colleagues because they represented the largest interest here, and "the others really did not matter." At another time, Mr. Wilson explained that it would have been difficult to contact them all, so he consulted with those representing the largest interests.

The Austrian and Japanese legations, with all the Latin American representatives, including those of Brazil, Chile, and Cuba, took the view that the constitutional government was justified in maintaining its authority, and that it was no business of foreign diplomats to interfere against the constitutional government in a domestic conflict. Following the call on Madero during which Ambassador Wilson, with the British minister Francis Stronge and the German minister Paul von Hintze telling President Madero that they protested against his continuing hostilities. Wilson, accompanied by Stronge, went to the arsenal and spoke with Díaz; as Wilson reported to Secretary of State Philander Knox that day, he "urged that firing be confined to a particular zone." Bombardment of the downtown continued, with civilians feeling the impact of the fighting. Bodies of civilians and soldiers were left in the streets, along with those of horses. Food was scarce.

=== 13–15 February: Wilson's actions, Madero's response, Senators' actions ===
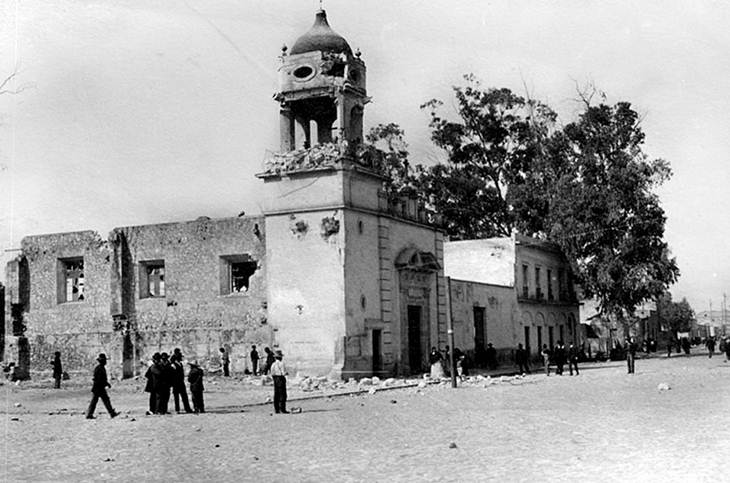
Parish of Campo Florido in the Doctores district of Mexico City during the Ten Tragic Days.

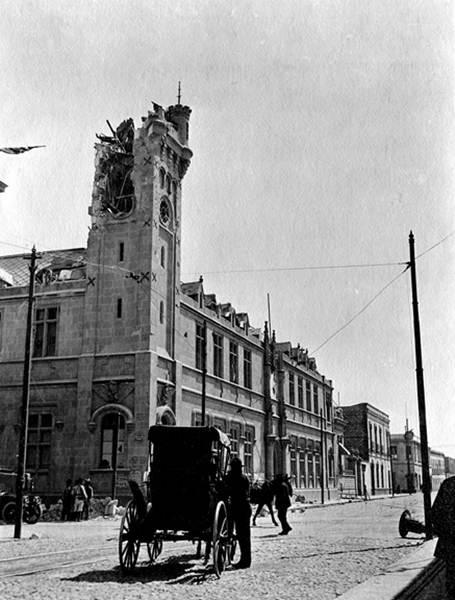
Old 6th police station during the Tragic Ten Days, in the historic center of Mexico City.

On February 13, the battle continued, and the relative positions of the combatants remained unchanged. But distressing conditions increased in parts of the city within range of the fire. Ambassador Wilson told Pedro Lascuráin, Madero's minister of foreign relations, that Madero ought to resign; as reported to Sec. Knox. Ambassador Wilson's language became: "Public opinion, both Mexican and foreign, holds the Federal Government responsible for these conditions."

On February 15, Ambassador Wilson requested the British, German and Spanish ministers to come to the embassy. He did not invite the other members of the diplomatic corps. He reported to Secretary Knox: "We considered the question of making direct representation to Madero relating to his resignation to save further bloodshed and possible international complications. The opinion of my assembled colleagues was unanimous and clear that we should at once, even without instructions, take this action to terminate the intolerable situation" and turn over the executive power to Congress. The Spanish minister was designated to visit the National Palace and inform the President of this unanimous opinion of these diplomats that he should resign. President Madero replied to the Spanish Minister that he did not recognize the right of diplomatists accredited to a nation to interfere in its domestic affairs; he called attention to the fact, which he feared some of the diplomatists had somehow overlooked, that he was the constitutional President of Mexico, and declared that his resignation would plunge the country into political chaos. He said might be killed, but he would not resign. Madero sent an angry message to U.S. President Taft. Taft had denied Ambassador Wilson plenary powers to act in Mexico, so Wilson's actions were as if he had such powers. Taft replied that President Madero must have misunderstood the message, that there was no imminent armed intervention from the U.S.

Among Mexican politicians, the situation undermined confidence in Madero's regime. On February 15, thirty senators, many of whom were followers of Félix Díaz, met and the vast majority voted to demand Madero's resignation. Madero had just received the message from the Spanish ambassador and now refused to meet directly with the representatives of the senators. Madero's Minister of Finance, Ernesto Madero, the president's uncle met with them. Biographer of General Huerta, Michael C. Meyer, sees February 15's events as encouraging to Huerta, who "wanted the Madero government to fall but he was concerned that he might not be given a prominent position in either the peace negotiations or the interim government to follow."

Later that same day, Ambassador Wilson went to the Palace, accompanied by the German Minister. Their objective, he says, was "to confer with Gen. Huerta." But, he goes on, "upon arrival, much to our regret, we were taken to see the President." Huerta was called in, however, and an armistice was agreed on. Returning to the embassy, the ambassador sent the U.S. military attaché to the arsenal to obtain, as he did, Diaz's consent to an armistice, over Sunday.

=== 16 February: armistice ===
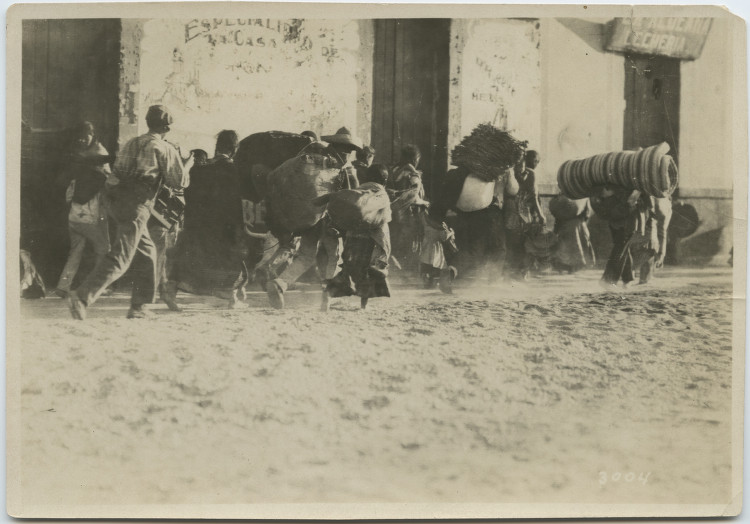
Civilians fleeing the danger zone, Mexico City February 16, 1913.

On Sunday, February 16, General Blanquet arrived with his regiment, having taken a week to travel forty miles. It was soon apparent that he was not going into the fight.

Huerta had been in communication with Ambassador Wilson, by means of confidential messenger, and an understanding had been reached. During the Sunday armistice (ostensibly arranged for the burying of the dead bodies and the removal of non-combatants from the danger zone), the details of treachery were arranged, and before the close of the day, Huerta sent word to Ambassador Wilson to that effect. Mr. Wilson's report to the State Department that Sunday night contained the euphemistic words: "Huerta has sent me a special messenger saying that he expected to take steps tonight towards terminating the situation."

The plot could not, for some reason be, carried out that night but the messenger came again on Monday morning. This time, Ambassador Wilson took Secretary Knox a little more into his confidence: "Huerta has sent his messenger to say that I may expect some action which will remove Madero from power at any moment, and that plans were fully matured…..I asked no questions and made no comment beyond requesting that no lives be taken—except by due process of law."

=== 17–18 February: Huerta/Diaz conspiracy ===
On the night of Monday the 17th, the ambassador told at least one newspaperman that Madero would be arrested at noon on Tuesday. Reporters were at the National Palace at the hour indicated, but they were disappointed. Nothing occurred at the Palace at noon.

At the Gambrinus restaurant, at noon, the president's brother, Gustavo A. Madero, was arrested, after breakfasting with Huerta and other men, who, at the conclusion of the meal, seized him and held him prisoner. The plan of seizing the person of the president was delayed only an hour or so. On Tuesday at 2 PM, Ambassador Wilson had the satisfaction of telegraphing the State Department: "My confidential messenger with Huerta has just communicated to me Madero's arrest."

On receipt of the messenger's report, that Tuesday afternoon, Ambassador Wilson sent a message to Félix Díaz at the arsenal, apprising him that President Madero had been arrested and that Huerta desired to confer with the rebel chieftain. It was agreed to hold the conference at the U.S. Embassy at the invitation of the ambassador, Henry Lane Wilson. At 9 PM Huerta arrived at the embassy.

Díaz, leader of the mutiny, Victoriano Huerta, the commander of Madero's forces, and the American ambassador spent the next three hours in conference in the smoking room of the U.S. embassy, agreeing to plan, known as the Pact of the Embassy, for a new government to succeed that of the betrayed and imprisoned Pres. Madero. Díaz pressed his claims for the presidential office, on the grounds that he had fought the battle. But Huerta's claims were stronger, for in truth, if he had not turned, the revolt could not have succeeded. (At this time, also, Huerta had command of more troops than Díaz.) Three times they were on the verge of parting in anger, said Ambassador Wilson, but his labors kept them together and they finally worked out what was represented as a compromise: Huerta would become the "Provisional President," but would call for an election in October and support Díaz for the permanent presidency. A cabinet was agreed on, Ambassador Wilson taking a leading part in this matter. The ambassador approved the appointment of Enrique Zepeda as Governor of the Federal District, and stipulated for the release of Madero's ministers. Ambassador Wilson made no stipulation concerning the president and the vice president.

That night, within an hour of the adjournment of the meeting at the embassy, Gustavo A. Madero, the president's brother, was driven into an empty lot just outside the arsenal, his body riddled with bullets, and thrown into a hole in the ground.

=== 18–19 February: Madero resigns ===
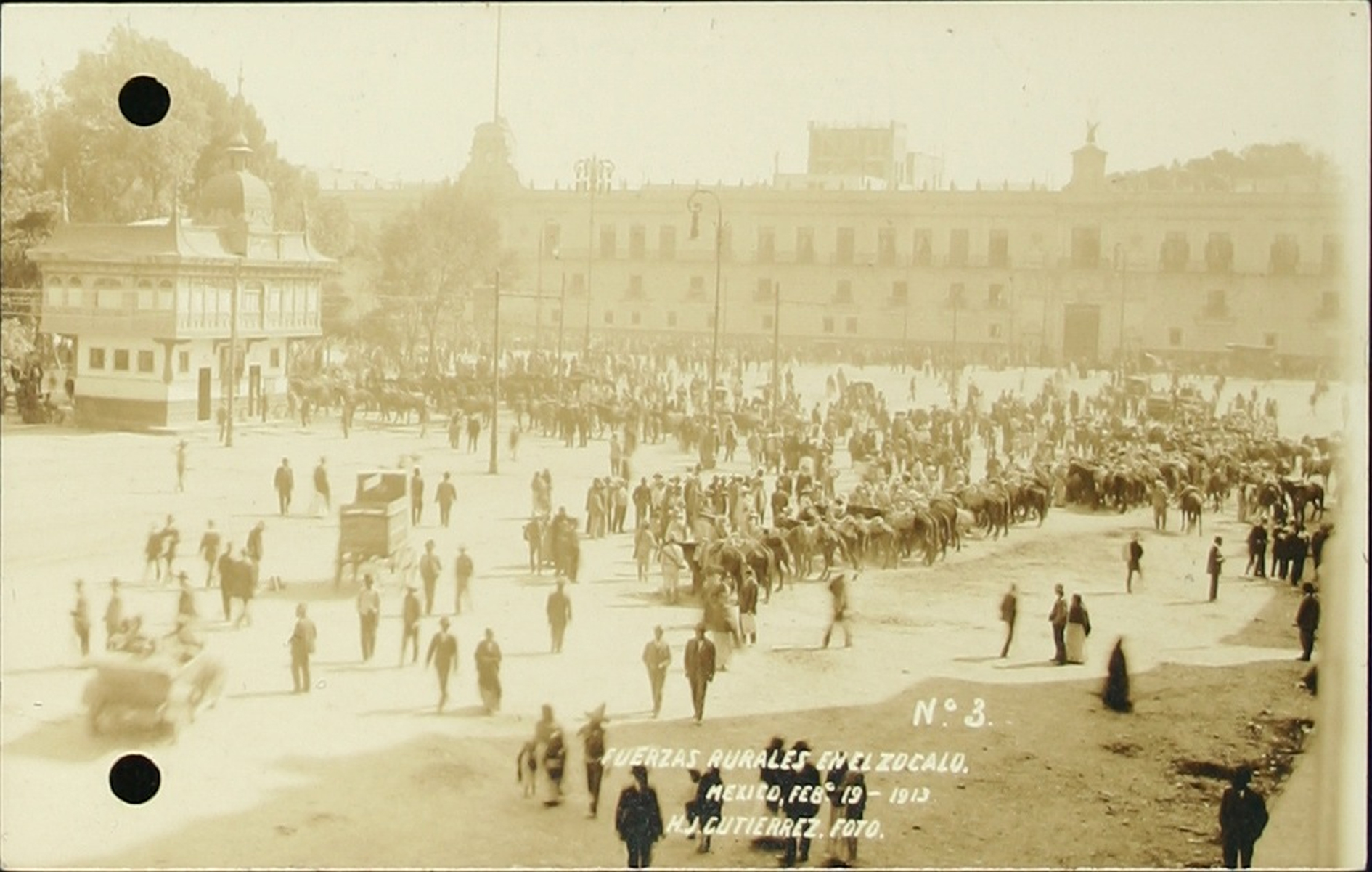
Rurales near the National Palace during the Decena_Trágica

General Huerta informed Ambassador Wilson and President Taft, "I have the honor to inform you that I have overthrown this Government. The armed forces support me, and from now on peace and prosperity will reign." With that, the violence in downtown Mexico City was replaced by civilians flooding the streets, no longer worried for their safety. The building of the leading Maderista newspaper was set ablaze.

Those who directed the coup saw the necessity for Madero and Pino Suárez to resign, so that there was some veneer of legality about the forced change of regime. Pino Suárez was promised safe passage from Mexico if he did resign. Both he and Madero did sign, but after that it was unclear what their fates would be. Leaving them alive posed a great threat to the usurpers. Huerta asked the U.S. Ambassador what should be done, send them into exile or place them in an insane asylum. The ambassador gave Huerta free hand in the matter. "General, do what you think is best for the welfare of Mexico."

The arrangement was that the resignations were to be placed in the hands of the Chilean and Cuban ministers for delivery only after the two 'retiring' officials and their families were safely out of the country. It seems, however, to have been necessary for the documents to receive the authentication of the head of the cabinet, the Minister of Foreign Relations, and, while they were passing through his hands, such pressure was brought to bear upon Pedro Lascuráin that he delivered the resignations directly and immediately into the hands of Madero's enemies.

A train stood ready at a Mexico City railway station to take Madero and Pino Suárez with their families down to Veracruz, where they were to go aboard the Cuban gunboat Cuba and be conveyed to a foreign shore. By 9 pm the families hurriedly prepared for departure, were gathered, waiting, on the platform. The Chilean and Cuban ministers, who had spent the day with Madero, had announced their intention of accompanying the party down to the port, and they appeared at the station, announcing that the president and vice president would soon follow. They did not come. About midnight the Chilean minister left the distressed women, hurried to the Palace, and asked to see General Huerta. The General send out word that he was very tired after a hard day's work and was resting; he would see the minister later. The minister waited until 2 am and was still refused admittance to Huerta. He could do nothing but return to the station and advise the party to return to their homes.

In the morning, claims were made that the delay had arisen because the military commander of the port of Veracruz had received telegrams from Mrs. Madero, which had led him to respond unsatisfactorily to Gen. Huerta's instructions. The commander is reported to have said, "By whose authority? I recognize only the authority of the constitutional President of México." It was believed by Maderistas, however, that it was the decision of the Chilean and Cuban ministers to accompany the party that cancelled the departure of the train, the plan having been to blow it up on the way to Veracruz.

The wife and mother of Madero, and the relatives of Pino Suárez, relieved to learn that the men were still alive but fearing the worst, now appealed to the American ambassador to grant the two political leaders asylum in his embassy. However Huerta announced that they would be transferred to more comfortable quarters — from the Presidential Palace to the main penitentiary of Mexico City.

=== 20 February: Huerta becomes president ===
Gen. Huerta assumed the presidency on Thursday, the 20th of February, carefully observing formalities which are held to establish the legality of his rule. The president and vice president having resigned, Madero's Minister of Foreign Relations, Pedro Lascuráin, was recognized as president for the few 45 minutes necessary for him to appoint Victoriano Huerta Minister of the Interior, and then resign, leaving Huerta to succeed him as president, according to the Constitution.

On the evening of February 20, an artillery barrage was directed against the Ciudadela barracks where Félix Díaz had established his base of operations. Three hundred rurales (mounted police) of the 18th Corps then rode down Balderas Street to attack the Ciudadela but were met by machine gun fire and scattered after losing 67 dead and wounded. It remains unclear whether the destruction of the 18th Corps was the result of a tactical blunder or a measure deliberately engineered by Huerta to weaken the forces loyal to Madero.

=== 22 February: assassination of Madero and Pino Suárez ===
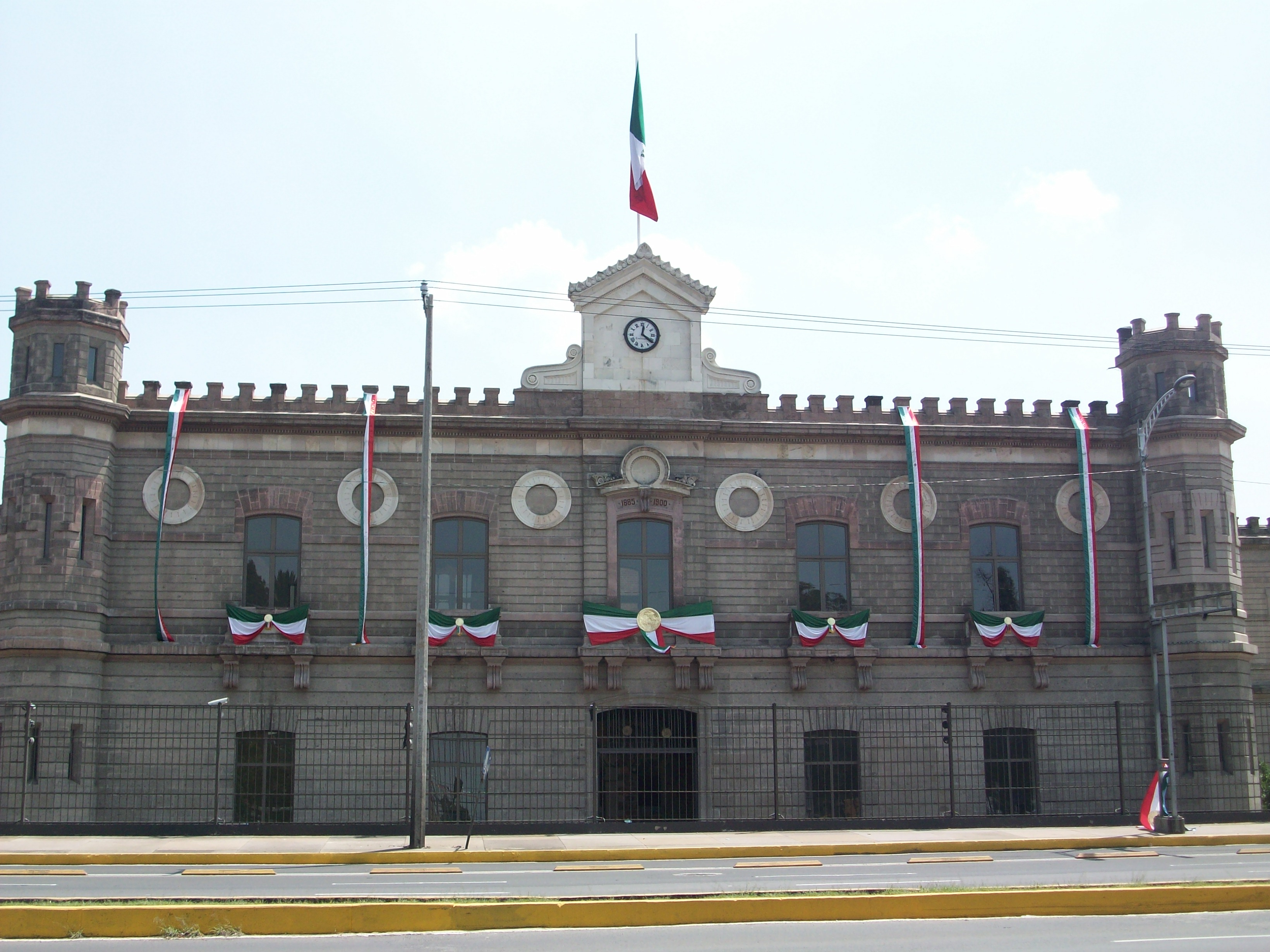
Lecumberri prison, where Madero and Pino Suárez were assassinated

Madero and Pino Suárez were told that they would be transferred to another prison. Taken by car, they were assassinated near by the walls of Lecumberri prison, from which Félix Díaz had only recently been freed. The two assassins were Federal officers, Francisco Cárdenas and Rafael Pimienta. According to historian Friedrich Katz, it "is hotly debated ...whether they acted on their own or on orders from Huerta," and if Ambassador Wilson was involved or knew. But there is strong evidence that Huerta gave the order and that Wilson knew.

Newspaper reporters waiting outside the Palace had observed that Madero and Pino Suárez were put into two automobiles, one in each, at about 11:45 pm, and were driven in the direction of the penitentiary, escorted by a dozen soldiers, under the command of Maj. Francisco Cárdenas of the Rurales. The vehicles did not go to the door of the penitentiary, but passed the street leading to it and went on to a vacant space behind the building. Here the automobiles stopped and shots were heard. What had actually occurred will probably never be known exactly. When reporters, who had followed the small convoy on foot, reached the scene they found the bodies of Madero and Pino Suárez lying near the cars, surrounded by soldiers and gendarmes. Major Cárdenas was still present and claimed to an American correspondent that a group of armed men had fired on the vehicles. The two political leaders had leapt from the cars running towards their presumed rescuers. They had then been killed in the cross-fire. This account was greeted with general disbelief, although Ambassador Wilson professed to accept it.

== Subsequent events ==
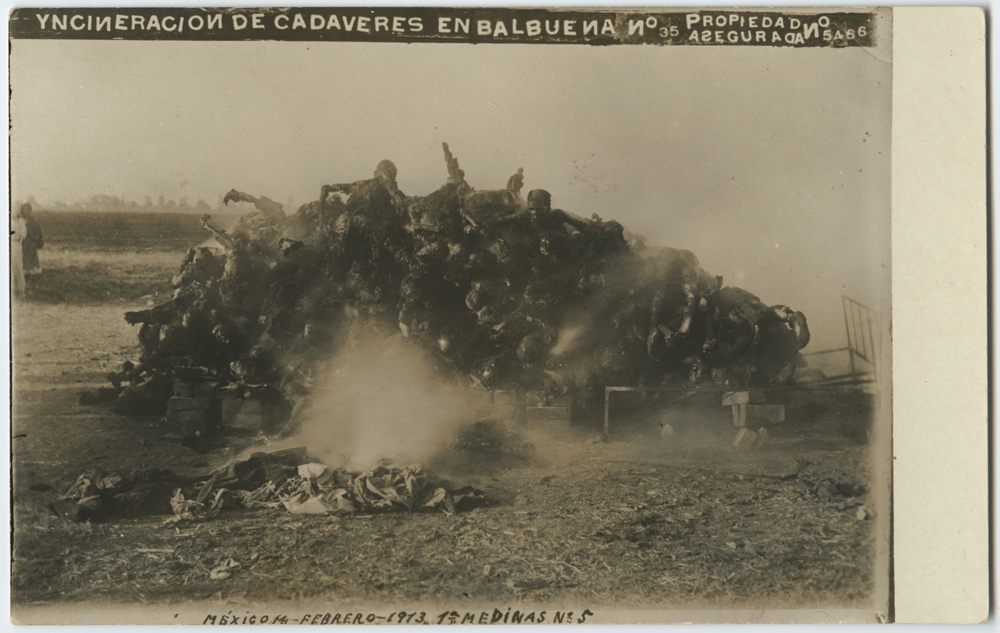
Incineration of victims' bodies in Balbuena

Right after Madero's murder, his widow sought the return of his corpse. On 24 February, Madero was buried in a private grave in the French cemetery in Mexico City and members of the Madero family went into exile. Madero's body remained in that cemetery until it was moved to the Monument to the Revolution in 1938.

The street violence ended, dealing with corpses in the streets of Mexico City was a task, to prevent spread of disease and return to normality in the capital. There were so many that they were incinerated rather than given individual burials preceded by funerals.

Both Huerta and his Minister of Foreign Relations stated that a formal inquiry would be made into the death of Madero. This was not however undertaken. Maj. Cárdenas was put under arrest, but was soon released, and promoted to lieutenant colonel. He was then placed in command of rurales in Michoacán. Later Cárdenas fled to Guatemala when the Huerta government was overthrown. In 1920 the post-revolutionary Mexican government requested the extradition of Cárdenas for the murder of Madero. Cárdenas committed suicide before this could be undertaken.

Ambassador Henry Lane Wilson never made any demand for an investigation. Instead, the ambassador criticized Madero and his family. He boasted that he had consistently predicted Madero's overthrow. In reply to questions as to whether it had been proper for a foreign diplomat to preside at a conference of two rebel generals and to help arrange the details of a new presidency, when the constitutional president, to whom he was accredited, was held prisoner, the Ambassador replied that it was necessary for the good of Mexico that Madero be eliminated. To the question as to the responsibility for the deaths of Madero and Pino Suárez, Ambassador Wilson said they were private citizens when they died, and that it would be impolite for a foreign power to demand an investigation into a purely domestic matter. He claimed that Madero had killed hundreds illegally, and it was no concern of his as to how the man died. “In fact, the person really responsible for Madero's death was his wife. She was the one to blame. Madero had to be eliminated. By her telegram to the commander at Veracruz, she made it impossible to allow him to leave the capital.”

== Photography and foreign news coverage ==
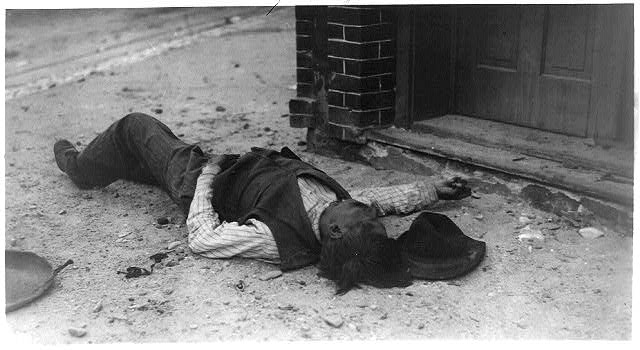
Civilian victim, dead on the street.

Because the events unfolded in the capital where there were many photographers and photo journalists, there is a large number of photos of the period. These should be considered a particular kind of documentary source, not merely illustrative of events described in written texts. These include images of the combatants, but also ones of the civilian population. In photographic collections and publications on the Revolution, the events in the capital are almost always included or the sole focus. Civilian casualties play an important role in complicating the understanding of the Revolution, since most published photographs focus on the combatants, or show civilians at train stations seeing off their loved ones as they went to war. A digital collection at Southern Methodist University of 43 photos found in a privately owned album donated to the library are a rich visual source. A commemorative publication by Mexican historian Enrique Krauze focuses on the Ten Tragic Days in particular.

The Ten Tragic Days were covered extensively in British newspapers, as Mexico was then host to a significant amount of foreign direct investment from British interests. Much of the British press' coverage of the events focused on the United States' role, displaying "a pervasive anxiety about U.S. involvement in the Mexican Revolution and its effects on British investment and political interests in Mexico." The press coverage also contained speculations on the fragile state of Mexican democracy, often attributing it to Mexico's multiracial demographics. However, several editorials and news reports published in the British press "held out hopes of a democratic future for Mexicans despite their cultural and ethnic prejudices, and some brainstormed about solutions for Mexico’s social, agrarian, and economic struggles." Other editorials and letters to the editors "tried to highlight attractive Mexican traits and appealed to their need for social justice."

== Legacy ==
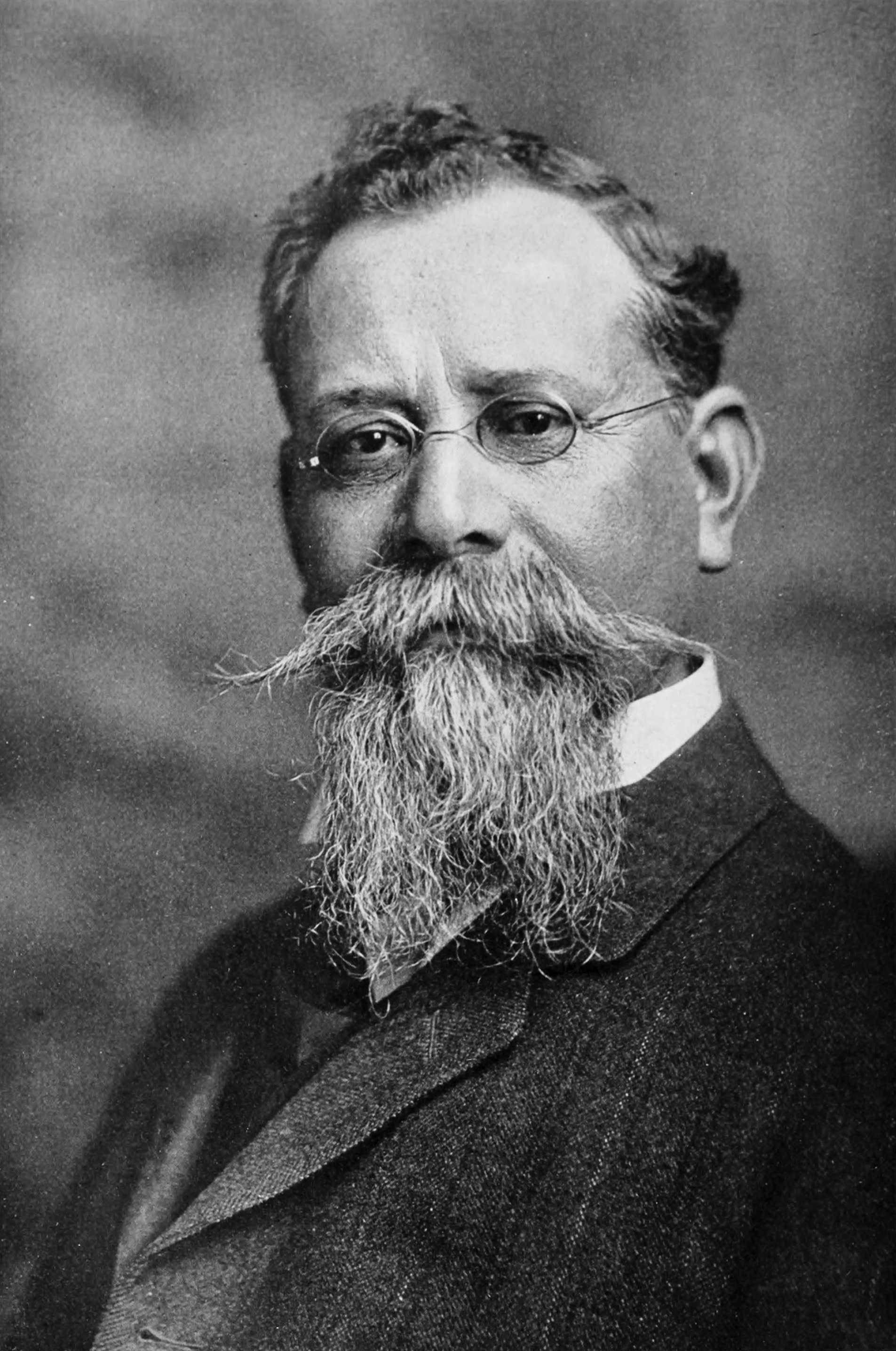
Portrait of Carranza by Harris & Ewing, c. 1915

The Ten Tragic Days is the formal designation of a specific set of events in the historiography of Mexico, indicating its importance in the Mexican Revolution and the shaping of historical memory. Madero's assassination during the 10-day coup immediately turned him into a martyr. "Madero the martyr meant more to the soul of Mexico than Madero the apostle [of democracy].

Huerta was recognized by most Mexican state governors, but Venustiano Carranza, governor of Coahuila refused and rose in rebellion against Huerta, bringing together a northern coalition to overthrow the regime brought to power by usurpation. The coup in Mexico City touched off uprisings that coalesced into the Constitutionalist Army, the ultimate winner in the Mexican Revolution. The Ten Tragic Days was the last successful coup to overthrow a Mexican president.
