= Félix Díaz (politician) =

Mexican politician (1868–1945)

Governor of Oaxaca
- In office 22 May 1911 – 3 June 1911
- Preceded by: Joaquín Sandoval
- Succeeded by: Jesús Acevedo

Personal details
- Born: 17 February 1868 Oaxaca City, Oaxaca, Mexico
- Died: 9 July 1945 (aged 77) Veracruz, Mexico
- Relatives: Félix Díaz Mori (father); Porfirio Díaz (uncle)
- Education: Heroic Military Academy
- Occupation: Military officer; politician

Military service
- Allegiance: Mexico
- Branch/service: Mexican Army; National Reorganizing Army
- Years of service: 1888–1920
- Rank: Brigadier General
- Battles/wars: Mexican Revolution; Ten Tragic Days

Félix Díaz Prieto (17 February 1868 – 9 July 1945) was a Mexican politician and general born in Oaxaca, Oaxaca. He was a leading figure in the rebellion against President Francisco I. Madero during the Mexican Revolution. He was the nephew of president Porfirio Díaz.

== Biography ==
Félix Díaz was a young boy when his uncle, General Porfirio Díaz, overthrew the government of President Sebastián Lerdo de Tejada in 1876, and remained in power until 1911, when he was forced to resign. He graduated as an engineer from the Colegio Militar in 1888, and rose to the rank of general. The Mexican Federal Army was being downsized by the president and did not see major combat during most of the Porfiriato. Well-connected socially in Mexico City and in Veracruz, Félix Díaz accumulated wealth from real estate. The president did not include his nephew in politics, due to his "limitations," instead giving him low-level positions as inspector general of the Mexico City police force and as a deputy in the congress. Congress was completely controlled by Díaz. Although Félix sought more powerful positions, Díaz was not supportive, and sent him away to Chile as a Mexican consul to prevent him from running in the Oaxaca gubernatorial elections. Félix Díaz resented the Científicos, ("scientists") who had a powerful influence in Díaz's government, and Félix allied himself with General Bernardo Reyes, the Científicos' political rival. Reyes had been a possible candidate for the newly created office of vice president, but Díaz blocked him and he went into exile. Some suggested Félix as a candidate, but Díaz dismissed that. When Porfirio Díaz was forced into exile by revolutionary forces in May 1911, most of his family went with him. Félix stayed in Mexico.

On October 12, 1912, he rose in revolt against Madero, but the revolt was suppressed by government troops on October 23, 1912. According to the German ambassador to Mexico friendly with officers in the Mexican army, "The Díaz revolution has collapsed because of the incompetence of its leader." Díaz was jailed and sentenced to death for treason, although Madero commuted the sentence to life imprisonment. Also incarcerated at the same time was General Reyes.

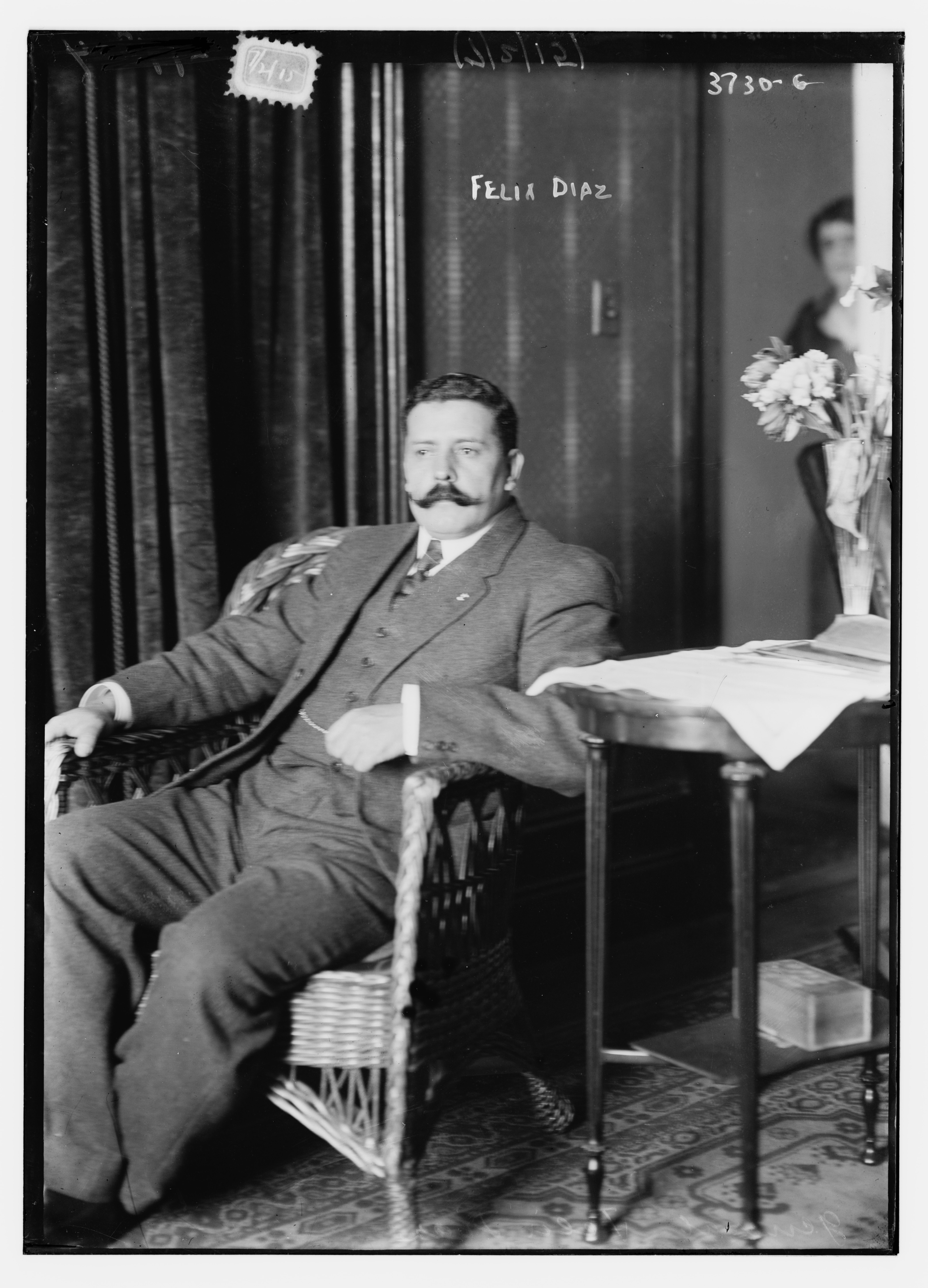
Felix Diaz

Díaz escaped from Lecumberri federal prison on February 9, 1913, beginning La decena trágica ("Ten Tragic Days"), the coup against Madero led by Díaz and General Bernardo Reyes. Reyes was killed in the fighting in front of the National Palace, but Díaz retreated to the downtown military arsenal of the Ciudadela, bombarding federal targets and the civilian population. General Victoriano Huerta was ostensibly loyal to the Madero government, but his defense of Mexico City and offense against Díaz's forces were lackluster. It became clear that Huerta was now opposed to Madero and a rival to Díaz. The U.S. Ambassador Henry Lane Wilson brokered a settlement between Díaz and Huerta at the embassy to end the bloodshed in Mexico City, name Huerta as provisional president, but promising to support Díaz's candidacy in what were anticipated to be a quick election. Díaz signed the Pact of the Embassy (Pacto de la Embajada). Huerta did not honor his part of the agreement and sent Díaz to Japan as an ambassador. On his return Díaz later sent into exile to New York City and then Havana.

He opposed Governor of Coahuila Venustiano Carranza, the head of the Constitutionalist faction, which had power in 1915 following the ouster of Huerta. Díaz returned to Mexico in May 1916 and became the leader of the National Reorganizing Army (Ejército Reorganizador Nacional). In 1917 he rebelled against Carranza's government from his base in Veracruz, issuing the Plan de Tierra Colorada. His new efforts were a failure and was forced to retreat to the south of Mexico, where he officially remained in arms.

In 1920, with the ouster and death of Carranza, Díaz sought an opportunity to make peace with the new regime of the Sonoran revolutionary generals who had ousted Carranza. Interim President Adolfo de la Huerta allowed Díaz to leave the country and even offered him 20,000 pesos. De la Huerta had already come to a peace agreement with General Pancho Villa, so now with the easing of Díaz out of the country, hardliners considered De la Huerta a reactionary. Making peace with these two potential threats to the new regime can be seen as political pragmatism. Díaz went into exile once again, in New Orleans. In 1922, Díaz issued a manifesto against the Constitution on 1917, but again his agitation went nowhere.

At the invitation of President Lázaro Cárdenas, Díaz returned to Mexico in 1937 and settled in Veracruz, where he died on 9 July 1945.

== See also ==
- Mexican Revolution
