= Julien Edmund Victor Gaujot =

U.S. Army Medal of Honor recipient (1874–1938)

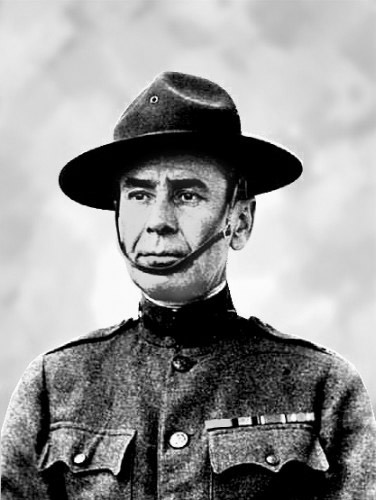
- Born: October 22, 1874; Eagle Harbor Township, Michigan, U.S.
- Died: April 7, 1938 (aged 63); Williamson, West Virginia, U.S.
- Relatives: Antoine A.M. Gaujot (brother)
- Military career
- Allegiance: United States
- Branch: United States Army
- Service years: 1898–1934
- Rank: Colonel
- Units: Troop K, 1st U.S. Cavalry
- Conflicts: Mexican Border; Spanish–American War; Philippine–American War; Cuban Pacification; World War I
- Awards: Medal of Honor

Julien Edmond Victor Gaujot (October 22, 1874 – April 7, 1938) was a United States Army Medal of Honor recipient.

He was the brother of Antoine. The Gaujot brothers are one of the seven sets of brothers that received the Medal of Honor and the only pair to receive the Medal for actions in different military actions. Both brothers also attended Virginia Polytechnic Institute and State University.

== Early life and school ==
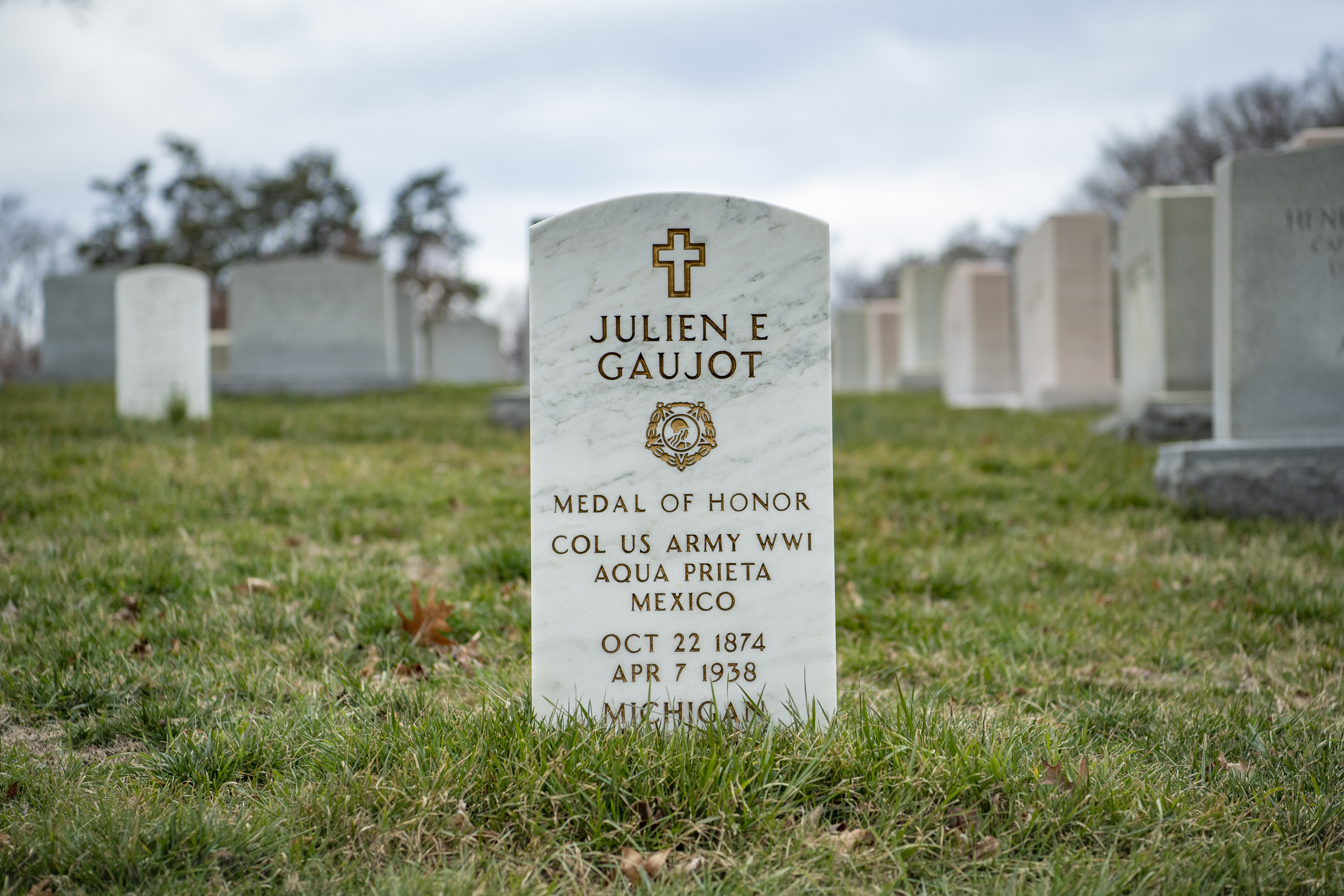
Grave at Arlington National Cemetery

Julien Edmond Victor Gaujot was born October 22, 1874, in Eagle Harbor, Michigan.

His father was a French-born mining engineer when he emigrated to Tamaqua, Pennsylvania. While there he met and married Susan Ellen McGuigan. The family eventually moved to Michigan and after that lived for a while in Ontario, Canada, before moving to Lynchburg, Virginia. In 1877 Julien's father, Ernest Gaujot, traveled to Japan to serve as general superintendent of mines.

In 1894, the family moved to what would become Mingo County, West Virginia.

In 1889 Julien enrolled in the Virginia Agricultural and Mechanical College (now Virginia Tech) but left in 1890 before graduating and worked as a civil engineer.

== Military career ==
Julien Gaujot joined the West Virginia volunteers in May 1898 as a 2nd Lieutenant of the 2nd West Virginia Volunteers. He was commissioned as a First Lieutenant of the 10th Cavalry Regiment (a Buffalo Soldier regiment) in February 1901. In 1902, Gaujot was charged and convicted by a general courts martial for using the "water cure" on a Filipino insurgent, for which he was suspended three months and docked $50 for each month.

Julien's brother, Antoine Gaujot, received the Medal of Honor for actions on December 19, 1899, as a United States Army corporal at the Battle of Paye near Mateo during the Philippine–American War. Julien, a regular army officer, became obsessed with his brother's achievement. Referring to Antoine, Julien said "He wears it for a watch fob, the damn civilian, I got to get me one of them things for myself if I bust." Julien Gaujot received the medal for actions on the Mexican border on April 13, 1911. He is the only soldier ever awarded the Medal for actions of a peacekeeping nature. In Douglas, Arizona, stray bullets from fighting among Mexican rebels and government troops caused American casualties. Infuriated, Julien mounted his beloved horse "Old Dick", and rode across the border into the teeth of the battle. He moved between the two groups of belligerents for an hour under heavy fire, eventually securing the safe passage of the Mexican government soldiers and American prisoners over the border to the United States. His actions saved five Americans taken prisoner by the Mexicans, 25 Mexican government soldiers, an unrecorded number of Mexican rebels, and averted further danger to those on the U.S. side of the border.

General Leonard Wood later said in referring to the incident that Julien's action warranted "either a court martial or a Medal of Honor." Wood also overrode the recommendations of the Mobile Army Division of the General Staff as well as the Army's Judge Advocate General, who recommended that Gaujot was ineligible for the Medal of Honor due to the legal requirement that the qualifying act be "performed in action." That Medal was approved November 23, 1912 and awarded by President William Howard Taft at the White House the following month, in one of the earliest White House presentations of the Medal of Honor. Julien served in the United States Army from 1898 to 1934 and participated in five major engagements: the Spanish–American War, Philippine–American War, Cuban Pacification, Mexican Border, and World War I.

He retired from the Regular Army in 1934 with the rank of colonel.

== Military awards and other honors ==
President Taft presenting the Medal of Honor to Julien Gaujot in the White House, December 1912

COL Gaujot's awards include the Medal of Honor and two campaign stars on his service ribbon for action in two major World War I offensives.

Medal of Honor
World War I Victory Medal
Army of Cuban Pacification Medal
Philippine Campaign Medal
Mexican Service Medal

=== Medal of Honor citation ===
General Orders: Date of Issue: November 23, 1912

"The President of the United States in the name of The Congress takes pleasure in presenting the Medal of Honor to

CAPTAIN (CAVALRY) JULIEN EDMUND GAUJOT
UNITED STATES ARMY

for service as set forth in the following CITATION:

For extraordinary heroism in action on 13 April 1911, while serving with Troop K, 1st U.S. Cavalry, in action at Aqua Prieta, Mexico. Captain Gaujot crossed the field of fire to obtain the permission of the rebel commander to receive the surrender of the surrounded forces of Mexican Federals and escort such forces, together with five Americans held as prisoners, to the American line.

/S/ WILLIAM H. TAFT"

== Death ==
Julien died in Radford, Virginia on April 7, 1938, and is buried at Arlington National Cemetery.

== See also ==
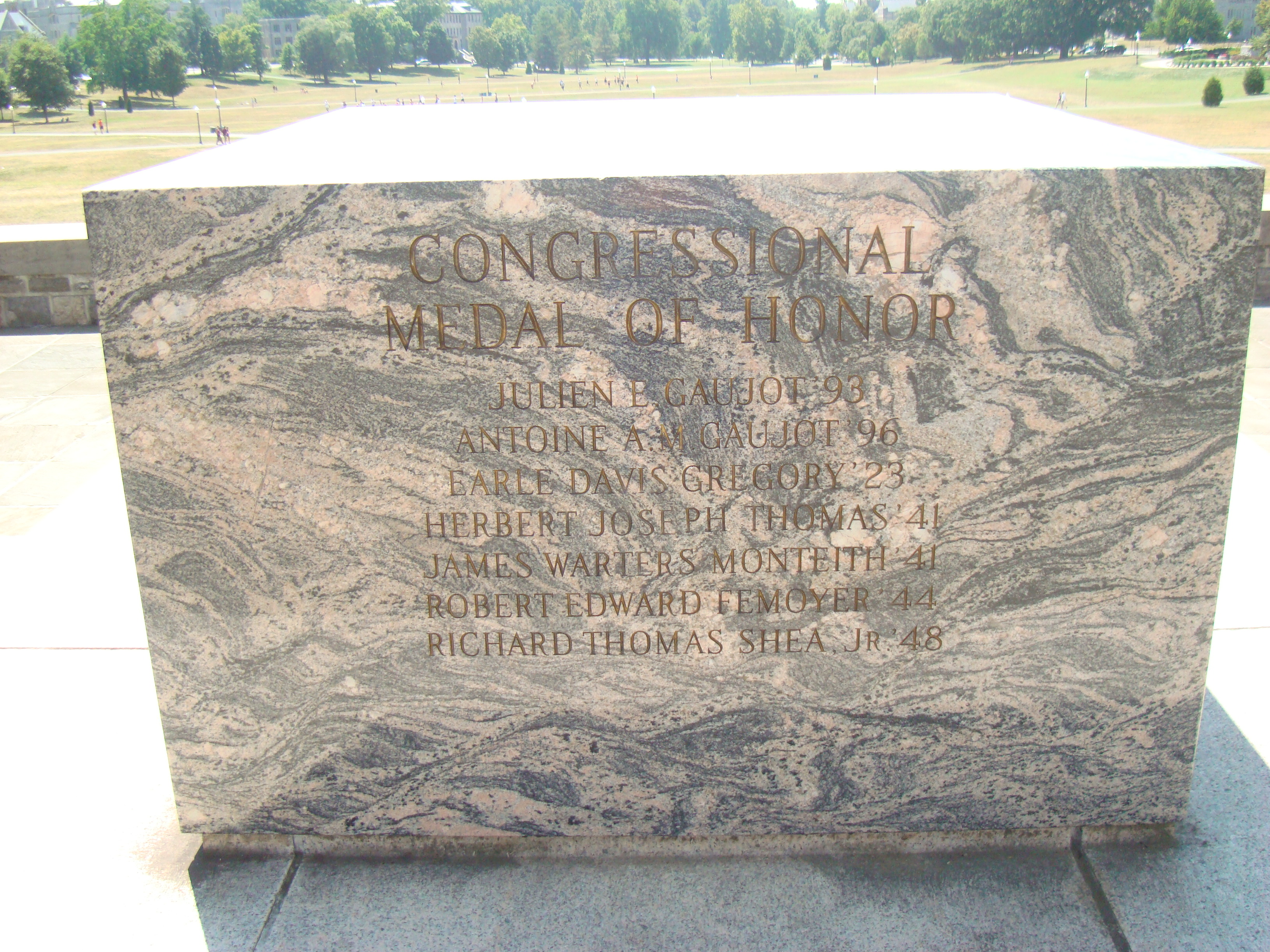
The names of both Gaujot brothers on Virginia Tech's cenotaph

- List of Medal of Honor recipients (Veracruz)
- Antoine August Michel Gaujot
