= Antoine August Michel Gaujot =

- Born: December 12, 1878; Eagle Harbor, Michigan, U.S.
- Died: April 14, 1936 (aged 57); Williamson, West Virginia, U.S.
- Burial place: Fairview Cemetery; Williamson, West Virginia
- Relatives: Julien Gaujot (brother)
- Military career
- Allegiance: United States
- Branch: United States Army
- Rank: Lieutenant Colonel
- Nickname: Tony
- Units: Company M, 27th Infantry, U.S. Volunteers
- Conflicts: Philippine–American War: Battle of Paye
- Awards: Medal of Honor
- Other work: State Police; Civil Engineer

Antoine August Michel Gaujot (December 12, 1878 – April 14, 1936) was a lieutenant colonel in the United States Army who received the Medal of Honor during the Philippine-American War in 1899. His brother Julien also received the Medal of Honor in 1911.

== Early life and education ==
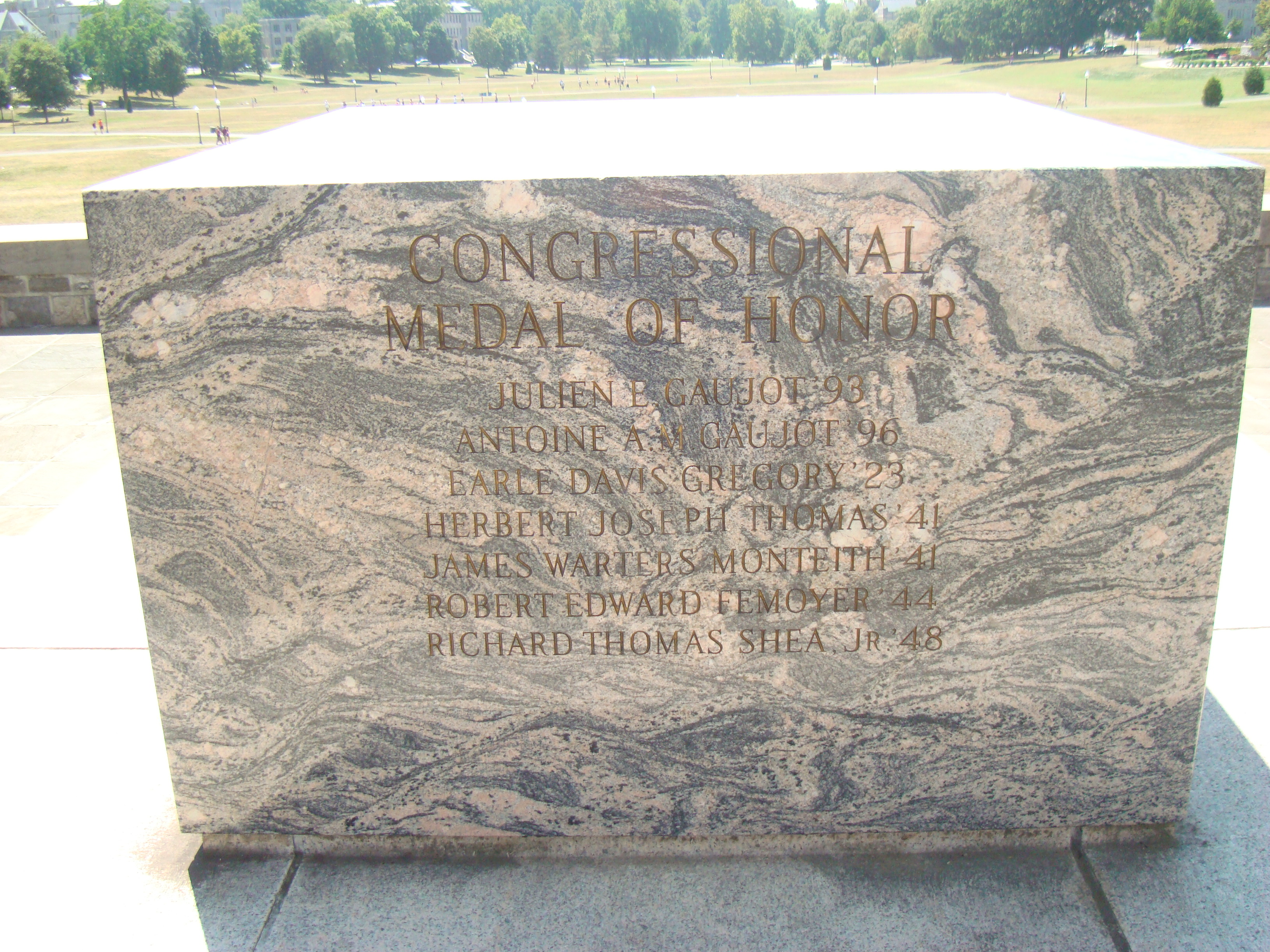
Both Gaujot's names on the Virginia Tech's MOH memorial stone.

Antoine August Michel Gaujot was born on December 12, 1878, in Eagle Harbor Township, Michigan, United States. His father, Ernest R. Gaujot, a French-born mining engineer, emigrated to Tamaqua, Pennsylvania, where he met and married Susan Ellen McGuigan. The family subsequently relocated to Michigan, then lived for a while in Ontario, Canada, before moving to Lynchburg, Virginia. Ernest Gaujot had traveled to Japan in 1877 to serve as general superintendent of mines. He solved some significant problems while in Japan, for which the Mikado reportedly conferred on him the honorary title of "general".

In 1894, the family moved to what the following year would become Mingo County, West Virginia, at a time of rapid expansion of coal mining operations in the region. Ernest Gaujot was resident engineer for the Koontz Brothers of New York City, whose mineral holdings in Mingo County were consolidated under the name United Thacker Coal Company.

Antoine A.M. Gaujot, also called "Tony", attended Virginia Polytechnic Institute (VPI) in 1896 and 1897 but did not graduate. A civil engineer by profession, he obtained the rank of lieutenant colonel in the Infantry Reserve.

== Military career ==
Antoine Gaujot received the Medal of Honor for actions on December 19, 1899, as a United States Army corporal at the Battle of Paye near Mateo during the Philippine–American War. He made persistent effort under heavy enemy rifle fire to retrieve a canoe from the opposite shore in order to help his unit cross the swollen river to attack the enemy; Gaujot was unsuccessful in his mission and did not bring back a canoe.

Antoine's medal was issued February 15, 1911, and sent to him by registered mail (a common procedure at that time). He was later commissioned in the National Guard and saw service during the Mexican Border Crisis and in France during World War I.

Tony was mustered out along with his brother and the rest of 2d West Virginia Volunteers on April 10, 1899.

He died on April 14, 1936, in Williamson, West Virginia. Records at Virginia Tech indicate that Antoine was murdered by Julien's son.

== Court martial ==
Although eventually ruled an accidental death Tony was tried by court martial for killing a soldier of the regiment at Camp Wetherhill. An undated manuscript handwritten statement, apparently written by the regimental adjutant, initially charged Tony with a violation of the 62d Article of War. "Murder, to the prejudice of good order and Military discipline."

The document alleged that, around 6 p.m. on November 29, 1898, Tony, "in attempting to arrest Private Frank Scurlock... secure[d] from the tent of his Captain without the Captain's Knowledge [sic], a revolver, and going to the tent wherein the said Private Frank Scurlock was, shoot him with the said revolver, in the neck," thereby causing his death. A typed document changed the charge to "Murder, in violation of the 58th Article of War," and charged that Tony "feloniously and with malice aforethought" shot and murdered Scurlock "by firing... a bullet from a revolver," inflicting "a mortal wound" from which "Scurlock languished and on the 5th day of December 1898, died."

Tony was tried by a general court martial at Camp Wetherhill but was acquitted of the charge. He was released from confinement and returned to duty on February 2, 1899. He was also repromoted to first sergeant, having been reduced in grade to duty sergeant on January 1. Within a week, Tony requested a 15-day furlough "for the purpose of visiting my parents at Williamson..." First Lt. Charles W. Cramer, acting commander of Company K, forwarded the request to the divisional adjutant, "approved." Cramer noted that Tony had "just been released from a confinement of 60 days duration for the killing of Private Scurlock of which he was acquitted by a General Court Martial...." Approval was warranted because, "The killing of Private Scurlock has greatly worried the mother of Sergeant Gaujot who is in very delicate health and she has written me a number of times asking me to procure him a furlough as soon as he was released."

== Military awards ==
LTC Gaujot's military awards include the following -

- Medal of Honor
- Philippine Campaign Medal
- World War I Victory Medal
- Mexican Border Service Medal

=== Medal of Honor citation ===
General Orders: Date of Issue: February 15, 1899

"The President of the United States in the name of The Congress takes pleasure in presenting the Medal of Honor to

CORPORAL ANTOINE AUGUST GAUJOT
UNITED STATES ARMY

for service as set forth in the following CITATION:

For most distinguished gallantry on 19 December 1899, while serving with Company M, 27th Infantry, U.S. Volunteers, in action at San Mateo, Philippine Islands. Corporal Gaujot attempted under a heavy fire of the enemy to swim a river for the purpose of obtaining and returning with a canoe.

/S/ WILLIAM MCKINLEY"

== See also ==
- List of Medal of Honor recipients
- List of Philippine–American War Medal of Honor recipients
