= William Bayard Hale =

American journalist

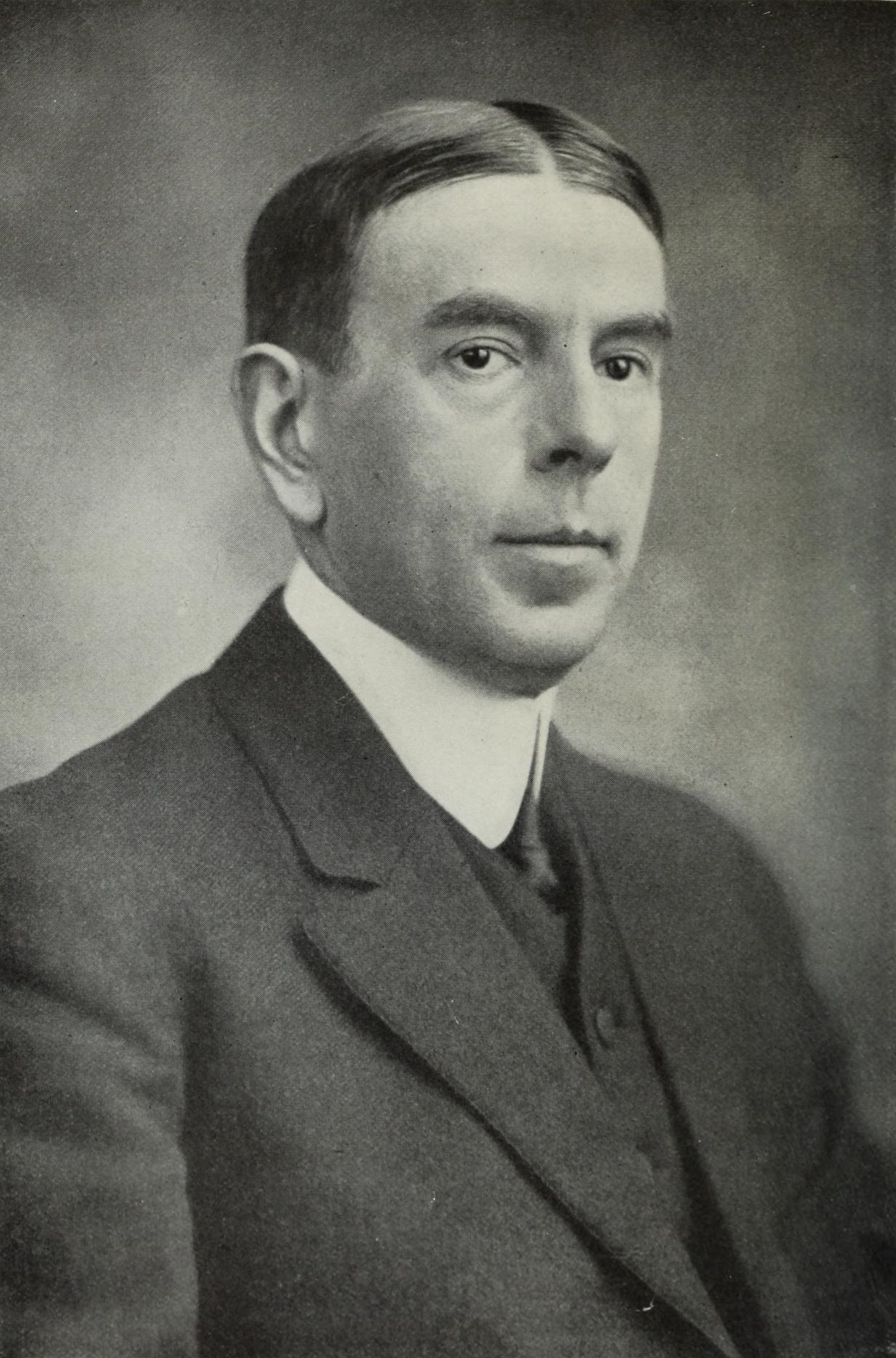
Portrait of William Bayard Hale

William Bayard Hale (1869 – April 10, 1924) was an American journalist. He wrote the 1912 campaign biography of Woodrow Wilson. Later, after souring on Wilson, he wrote a derisive critique of Wilson's literary style.

He is described in Barbara Tuchman's The Zimmerman Telegram as a German propaganda agent.

According to the Columbia Electronic Encyclopedia (6th edition, 2012),

His report (1913) as confidential agent in Mexico implicated ambassador Henry Lane Wilson in the murder of Francisco Madero by Victoriano Huerta. The report influenced the president to recall Wilson and initiate a campaign to drive Huerta from Mexico. In 1915, Hale turned propaganda adviser for Germany until the United States entered World War I. His book, "American Rights and British Pretensions on the Seas" (1915), stirred American resentment of the British blockade. Denounced and ostracized in the United States, he lived in Europe after World War I.

He died in Munich on April 10, 1924.
