= David E. Thompson =

American diplomat (1854–1942)

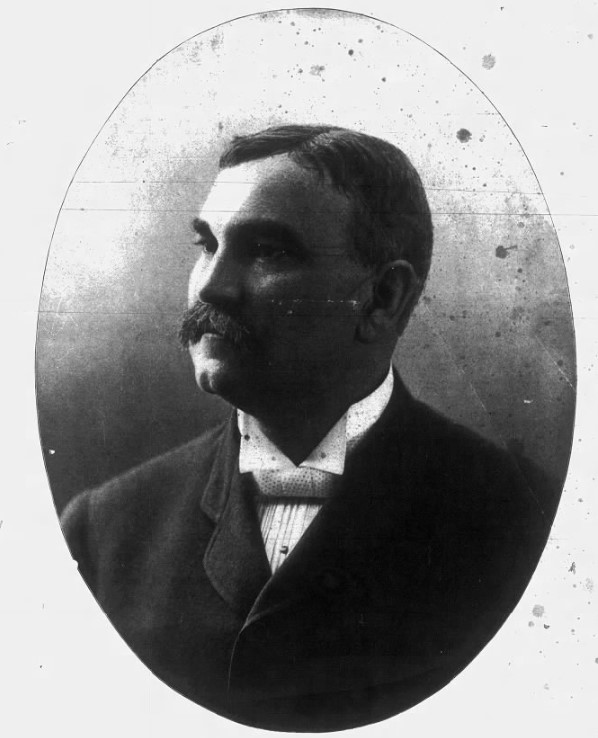

U.S. Ambassador to Mexico
- In office 1906–1909

U.S. Ambassador to Brazil
- In office 1905

U.S. Minister to Brazil
- In office 1902–1905

Personal details
- Born: February 28, 1854
- Died: August 25, 1942 (aged 88)

David Eugene Thompson (February 28, 1854 – August 25, 1942) was an American diplomat.

Thompson was born in 1854 in Nebraska. He was a diplomat, and served as U.S. Minister to Brazil between 1902 and 1905, U.S. Ambassador to Brazil in 1905, and U.S. Ambassador to Mexico between 1906 and 1909.

In 1917, Thompson was the subject of an attempted blackmail scheme, which was foiled.

Diplomatic posts
Preceded by Edwin H. Conger	United States Ambassador to Mexico; 1906–1909	Succeeded by Henry Lane Wilson
Preceded by Charles Page Bryan	United States Minister to Brazil; 1 April 1903–16 March 1905	U.S. mission upgraded from Legation to Embassy
U.S. mission upgraded from Legation to Embassy	United States Ambassador to Brazil; 16 March 1905–3 November 1905	Succeeded by Lloyd C. Griscom
