= Sophia Loren: Her Own Story =

1980 American TV film

- Genre: Biography; Drama
- Based on: Sophia, Living and Loving: Her Own Story by A.E. Hotchner
- Written by: Joanna Crawford
- Directed by: Mel Stuart
- Starring: Sophia Loren; Armand Assante; John Gavin; Rip Torn; Theresa Saldana
- Music by: Fred Karlin
- Country of origin: United States
- Original language: English

Production
- Executive producers: Roger Gimbel; Herbert Hirschman
- Producers: Peter Katz; Alex Ponti
- Cinematography: Alberto Spagnoli
- Editor: Art Stafford
- Running time: 150 minutes
- Production companies: EMI Television; Roger Gimbel Productions

Original release
- Network: NBC
- Release: October 26, 1980

Sophia Loren: Her Own Story is a 1980 American television film directed by Mel Stuart and starring Sophia Loren as herself. The film was written by Joanna Crawford based on the 1979 biographical book Sophia, Living and Loving: Her Own Story by A.E. Hotchner and originally aired on NBC on October 26, 1980.

== Plot ==
A dramatization of the life of Italian actress Sophia Loren from her childhood in Naples to her international stardom. Loren plays herself during adulthood and her mother Romilda Villani.

The story begins in 1933, when Sophia's mother, Romilda Villani, wins a Greta Garbo look-alike contest, but is prevented by her parents from collecting the prize - a trip to America and a screen test. Angry and bitter, Romilda runs away to Rome where she looks in vain for work as an actress, and where she meets a charming rake, Riccardo Scicolone, and moves in with him. She becomes pregnant and when Riccardo refuses to marry her, she returns home in disgrace to her family with the infant Sophia. However, Romilda continues to see Riccardo and they have another child - Maria - yet Riccardo still will not marry her.

During the Second World War, Romilda and the family are forced to flee to Naples, where they survive the worst of the bombing and try to get enough food to stay alive. The young Sophia is injured when shrapnel from an exploding bomb hits her chin. The family return to Pozzuoli where Romilda turns the living room of their house into a cafe and sings to the patrons - mostly soldiers - to make a living.

Years pass and Sophia grows into a beautiful but shy teenager. Romilda does her best to shield her from men and plans to build the acting career for Sophia that she could never have for herself. At Romilda's insistence, Sophia enters a beauty contest and wins second prize, part of which is a trip to Rome. Once there Sophia starts her free acting lessons. Also as part of the prize, she and Romilda try out for parts in the American film production of Quo Vadis and get and make it. Soon after, Sophia gets a job acting in the fumetti, a photographic novel publication and continues to look for work.

When Romilda has to return to Pozzouli to care for the ailing Maria, Sophia goes with friends to a restaurant where she meets Carlo Ponti. He invites her to his office the next day to discuss her career. After giving her a screen test Carlo begins to manage Sophia's career, much to the dismay of Romilda who doesn't trust his intentions. Finally Carlo makes good his promises and with Vittorio de Sica's help, gets Sophia her first big part in the film The Gold of Naples. From then on its a series of larger parts until, she is cast opposite Cary Grant and Frank Sinatra in the film Pride and the Passion and goes to America for the first time.

Carlo and Sophia start having an affair and it has gone well despite the fact that Carlo is still married and can never get a divorce under (the then) existing Italian law though his own wife is willing. Sophia however, becomes temporarily distracted by the attentions of Cary Grant who woos her. When Carlo expresses his concern that he will lose her, Sophia tells him that he cannot offer her marriage and children, which is the one thing she wants in life. Soon after, Carlo is told by his lawyers that a divorce is possible and Carlo and Sophia are married by proxy in Mexico.

Sophia's career progresses and against her better judgement, she consents to do Two Women in which she will be required to play the mother of a teenage girl wandering the roads of a war-torn Italy. She is nominated for an Academy Award for her work but her real joy is that she discovers that she is pregnant. Having already suffered from several miscarriages, Sophia is anxious. Tragically something goes wrong and she loses the baby. More trouble lies ahead however, for despite her success in winning the Oscar, Carlo's lawyers tell him that the proxy marriage was illegal. Fortunately Carlo's wife finds a solution. All three will become French citizens, obtain a divorce, and Sophia and Carlo can then get married. However, neither Sophia nor Carlo will ever be able to return to Italy for fear of being arrested for adultery (unless there is a change in the Italian law). Still depressed over the loss of her baby, Sophia goes to visit her father, Riccardo, whom she hasn't seen for years and finds that he has not only followed her career, but has the entire corner of one room dedicated to memorabilia. Riccardo tries to articulate how sorry he is for the years they were not together as a family.

Soon Sophia finds that she is pregnant again and finds a miracle doctor who specializes in bringing women to term in their pregnancies. Sophia takes to her bed for the entire nine months of her pregnancy and finally gives birth to a healthy baby boy, and indulges the dozens of photographers awaiting the birth in the hospital lobby with pictures for the papers. Sophia reaches what she believes to be the pinnacle of her life, and has the security of family and children to take the place of the torturous and traumatic memories of her childhood.

== Cast ==
- Sophia Loren as Sophia / Romilda Villani
  - Ritza Brown as Sophia (aged 16)
  - Chiara Ferraro as Sophia (aged 4–7)
- Armand Assante as Riccardo Scicolone
- John Gavin as Cary Grant
- Rip Torn as Carlo Ponti
- Theresa Saldana as Maria Scicolone
- Edmund Purdom as Vittorio De Sica
- Riccardo Cucciolla as Dominico Villani
- Anna Miserocchi as Louisa Villani
- Francesca De Sapio as Dora
- Cyrus Elias as Guido

== Production ==
"I thought it was an extremely dangerous thing to do", said Gavin of playing Cary Grant. "I wouldn't have touched the role if I thought it wasn't done in good taste... I realise I'm laying myself wide open to criticism. All I can say is I'll do the best I can."
