= Julian Nava =

American educator & diplomat (1927–2022)

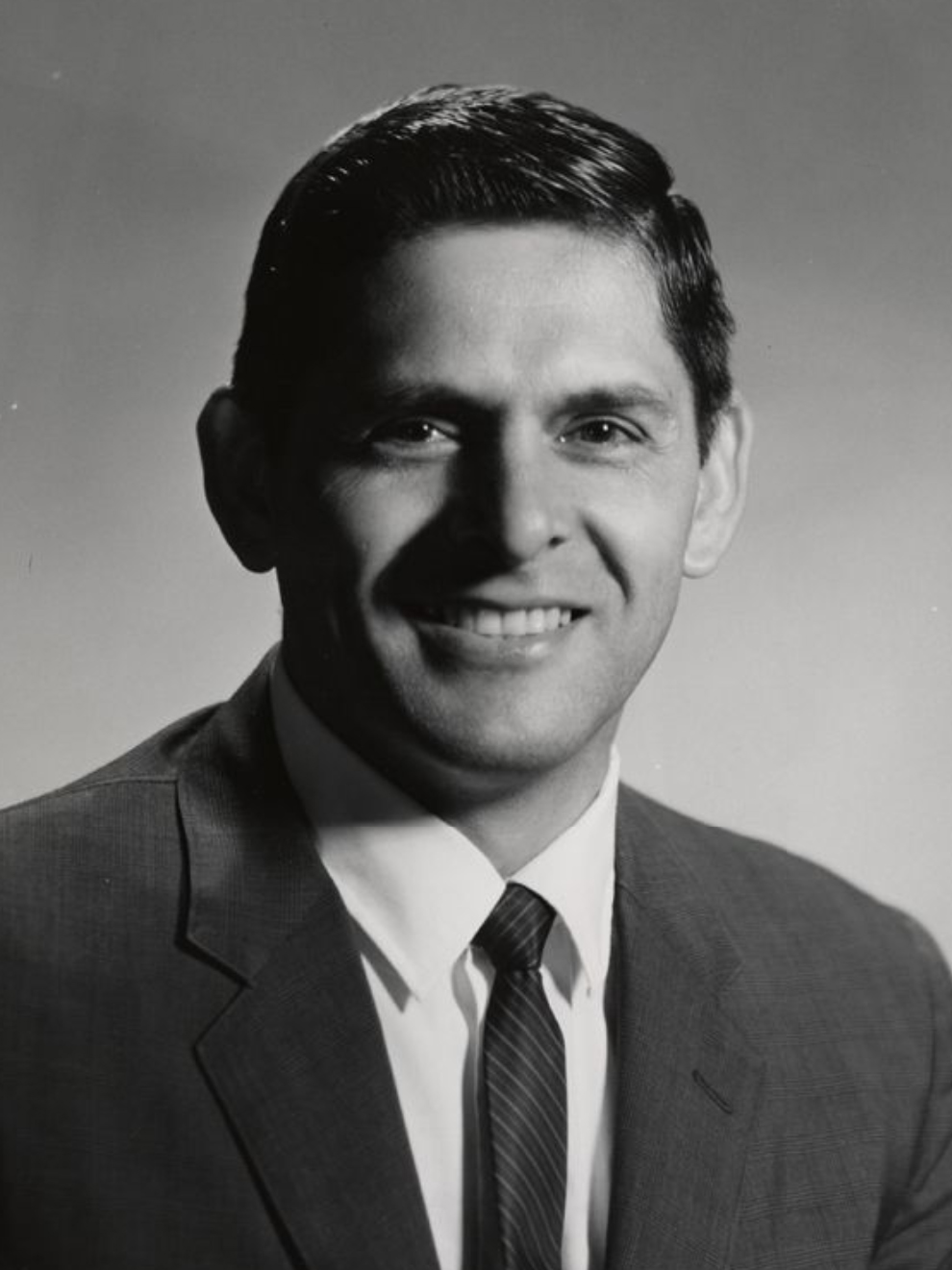

United States Ambassador to Mexico
- In office May 7, 1980 – April 3, 1981
- President: Jimmy Carter
- Preceded by: Patrick Joseph Lucey
- Succeeded by: John Gavin

Personal details
- Born: June 19, 1927 Los Angeles, California, U.S.
- Died: July 29, 2022 (aged 95) San Diego, California, U.S.
- Party: Democratic
- Spouse: Patricia Nava
- Education: Pomona College; Harvard University

Julian Nava (June 19, 1927 – July 29, 2022) was an American educator and diplomat. A member of the Democratic Party, Nava served as the United States Ambassador to Mexico from 1980 to 1981.

== Life ==
Julian Nava was born in Los Angeles, California, to Mexican immigrants in 1927, and was one of eight siblings. Nava grew up in the barrio of East Los Angeles In 1945, he volunteered for the Air Corps of the United States Navy. Nava, along with other "Rough Riders" who had volunteered for the Armed Forces, was allowed to wear his Navy uniform for the Roosevelt High School graduation ceremony in 1945. Upon his return to Los Angeles, Nava studied at East Los Angeles Community College before transferring to Pomona College, one of the prestigious Claremont Colleges. After earning his undergraduate degree in history in 1951, Nava earned a PhD in Latin American history from Harvard University in 1955. He taught in Venezuela, Spain, Puerto Rico, and Colombia, where he founded Centro de Estudios Universitarios in Bogotá. From 1957 to 2000, Nava was Professor of History at California State University, Northridge (CSUN). At the time of his death Nava was a Professor Emeritus of History.

In 1967, the Congress of Mexican American Unity (ninety-two community groups) nominated him to run for the Los Angeles Unified School District Board of Education. Nava became the first Mexican-American to serve on the board (composed of thirteen cities including Los Angeles). He was elected to three consecutive terms, from 1967 to 1979.

In 1980, he was appointed U.S. Ambassador to Mexico by President Jimmy Carter. He was the first Mexican-American to hold the position.

In 1981, Nava was awarded an honorary Doctor of Humane Letters (L.H.D.) degree from Whittier College.

In 1992, he ran for mayor of Los Angeles. In 1993, Nava was a pallbearer at the funeral of the labor leader Cesar Chavez. Nava had worked with Chavez since his time with the Community Service Organization in Los Angeles immediately after the Second World War.

In the 2006 HBO film Walkout, the role of Dr. Julian Nava is played by director Edward James Olmos. Independently, Nava produced several documentary films. He explored the history of the Basque people in “Song of the Basque,” funded by the Basque government.

He then produced and co-directed "Voices of Cuba" with Todd Mattox. More recently, Nava produced a documentary on cross-border migration to and from the United States in two languages, "Zacatecanos de ida y vuelta" ('Roundtrip Zacatecanos'). Nava greatly enjoyed travel and visited Mexico, Venezuela, Argentina, Spain, Great Britain, Russia, China, and Tibet.

Nava lectured widely about multicultural education and served on the board of directors of Encuentros, which promotes education among young Latino males. In 2011, a LAUSD school was named after him—the Dr. Julian Nava Learning Academy . In 2014 another LAUSD school was named after him—the Nava College Preparatory Academy. In 2015, Nava published a historical novel, Taming the Chinese Dragon: Young Love in Changing Tibet.

== Personal life ==
Nava died on July 29, 2022, at the age of 95. He was retired, and lived in San Diego County with his wife Patricia.

== Legacy ==
Nava's archives are held in the Special Collections and Archives section of the University Library at California State University, Northridge. Another collection of his papers is held at UCLA.

== Bibliography ==
- Mexican Americans: A Brief Look at Their History, 1970. New York City: Anti-Defamation League of B'nai B'rith.
- The Mexican American in American History, 1973. New York City: American Book Co. ISBN 0-278-47381-4
- Mexican American Profiles: Bilingual Biographies for Today, 1974 (with Michelle Hall). Walnut Creek, California: Aardvark Media.
- California: Five Centuries of Cultural Contrasts, 1976 (with Bob Barger). Beverly Hills: Glencoe Press.
- Julian Nava: My Mexican-American Journey, 2002. Houston: Arte Público Press. ISBN 1-55885-364-2
- The Latino Guide to Creating Family Histories: A Handbook for Students, Parents & Teachers, 2012 (WPR Books) ISBN 978-1-889379-49-4
- Taming the Chinese Dragon: Young Love in Changing Tibet, 2015. (WPR Book) ISBN 978-1-889379-55-5

Diplomatic posts
| Preceded by Patrick J. Lucey | U.S. Ambassador to Mexico; 1980–1981 | Succeeded by John Gavin |
