= Charles J. Pilliod Jr. =

American business executive and diplomat (1918–2016)

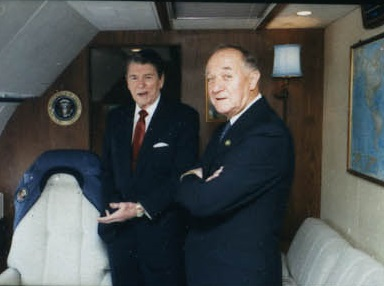
- right, on Air Force One in 1988, with President Ronald Reagan, left.

United States Ambassador to Mexico
- In office November 4, 1986 – April 7, 1989
- President: Ronald Reagan
- Preceded by: John Gavin
- Succeeded by: John D. Negroponte

Personal details
- Born: October 20, 1918 Cuyahoga Falls, Ohio, U.S.
- Died: April 18, 2016 (aged 97)
- Spouse: Nancy J. Conley
- Education: Muskingum College; Kent State University
- Occupation: Diplomat, Executive

Charles J. Pilliod Jr. (October 20, 1918 – April 18, 2016) was an American business executive and diplomat. He was ambassador to Mexico from 1986 to 1989.

== Biography ==
Pilliod served in World War II from 1942 to 1945 as a pilot in the 20th Air Force. He flew the Boeing B-29 Superfortress over China and Japan.

Pilliod was the CEO of the Goodyear tire company from 1974 to 1983. Pillion began his career at Goodyear in 1941 as a trainee, where he worked double shifts and enrolled in management training courses. His first promotion came within a year, when he was chosen to supervise production of fuel tanks for military aircraft. He eventually moved to export sales, living in Panama, Peru, Colombia, Brazil, and England.

When Pilliod became CEO in 1974, he faced a major investment decision regarding the radial tire, which today has a market share of near 100%. As a result of his actions, today only Goodyear, of the five biggest U.S. tire firms, remains independent.

At the time, the U.S. tire industry built tires based on bias ply technology, dating to 1888. In 1946, Michelin developed the radial tire method of construction, which quickly spread in France, Michelin's home country. Because of its superiority in tread life, handling, safety from blowouts, and fuel economy, use of this technology quickly spread throughout Europe and Asia. In the U.S., the bias-ply tire construction persisted, caused by tire and automobile manufacturers in America "concerned about transition costs." In 1968, Consumer Reports, an influential American magazine, acknowledged the superiority of radial construction, and in 1971 the Lincoln Continental Mark III became the first American made car with standard OEM radial tires.

Radial tires required different methods of construction, and the U.S. manufacturers were not set up to produce this product. Industry estimates of this investment were substantial, and Goodyear eventually invested close to $3 Billion in this new technology. For comparison, Michelin bought competitor Uniroyal-Goodrich in 1989 for just $1.5 Billion. The workforce also needed to be retrained, since radials required greater "accuracy and consistency" in construction. Despite heavy criticism at the time, Pilliod invested heavily in new factories and tooling to build the radial tire.

Sam Gibara, who headed Goodyear from 1996 to 2003, has noted that without the bold action of Pilliod, Goodyear "wouldn't be around today."

When Pilliod was appointed Ambassador in 1986, the U.S. and Mexico were experiencing tensions over the illegal drug trade. He favored behind the scenes discussions with Mexican authorities about the issue. He wished to improve relations, "and you won't do that by bashing" he said in 1987.

== Awards and honors ==
- 1972: Honorary Commander of the Most Excellent Order of the British Empire
- Two awards of merit from Luxembourg and two from Brazil
- Honor of the Officer in the Order of Leopold II in Belgium
- Mexican Order of the Aztec Eagle
- Automotive Hall of Fame
- National Tire Dealers & Retreaders Association Hall of Fame
- 1982: Horatio Alger Award Winner
- 1982: Golden Plate Award of the American Academy of Achievement

Diplomatic posts
Preceded by John Gavin	U.S. Ambassador to Mexico; 1986 – 1989	Succeeded by John Negroponte
