= John Gavin =

American actor (1931–2018)

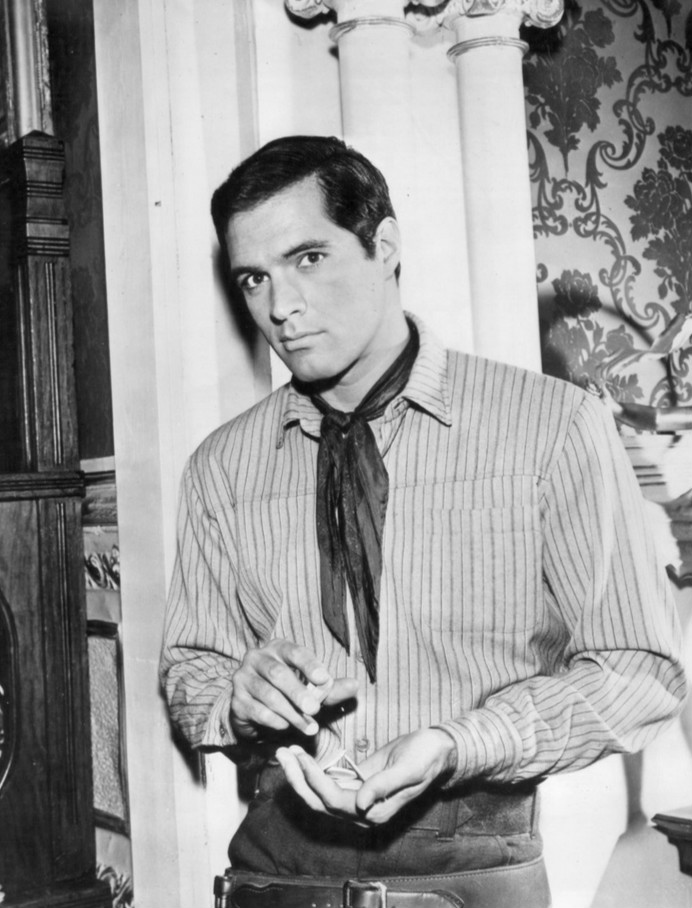
- Gavin in Destry (1964)

United States Ambassador to Mexico
- In office June 5, 1981 – June 10, 1986
- President: Ronald Reagan
- Preceded by: Julian Nava
- Succeeded by: Charles J. Pilliod Jr.

President of the Screen Actors Guild
- In office 1971–1973
- Preceded by: Charlton Heston
- Succeeded by: Dennis Weaver

Personal details
- Born: Juan Vincent Apablasa; April 8, 1931 Los Angeles, California, U.S.
- Died: February 9, 2018 (aged 86) Beverly Hills, California, U.S.
- Party: Republican
- Spouses: Cecily Evans (m. 1957; div. 1965) Constance Towers (m. 1974)
- Children: 2
- Education: Stanford University
- Occupation: Actor; diplomat

Military service
- Branch/service: United States Navy
- Years of service: 1951–1955
- Rank: Lieutenant
- Battles/wars: Korean War

John Gavin (born Juan Vincent Apablasa; April 8, 1931 – February 9, 2018) was an American actor and diplomat who was the president of the Screen Actors Guild (1971–1973) and the United States Ambassador to Mexico (1981–1986). Among the films in which he appeared were A Time to Love and a Time to Die (1958), Imitation of Life (1959), Spartacus (1960), Psycho (1960), Midnight Lace (1960), and Thoroughly Modern Millie (1967), playing leading roles for producer Ross Hunter.

== Early life ==
Gavin was born in Los Angeles as Juan Vincent Apablasa II. His father, Juan Vincent Apablasa, Sr., was of Chilean descent and his mother, Delia Diana Pablos, was a Mexican-born aristocrat. When Juan was two, his parents divorced and his mother married Herald Ray Golenor, who adopted Juan and changed his name to John Anthony Golenor.

After attending Roman Catholic schools, St. John's Military Academy (Los Angeles), and Villanova Preparatory (Ojai, California), he earned Bachelor of Arts degrees in economics and Latin American affairs from Stanford University, where he was in the Navy ROTC, did senior honors work in Latin American economic history, and was a member of Chi Psi fraternity.

=== Military service ===
During the Korean War Gavin was commissioned in the U.S. Navy serving aboard the USS Princeton off Korea, where he served as an air intelligence officer from 1951 until the end of the war in 1953. Due to Gavin's fluency in both Spanish and Portuguese, he was assigned as flag lieutenant to Admiral Milton E. Miles until he completed his four-year tour of duty in 1955. He received an award for his work in the Honduras floods of 1954.

In a 1960 interview Gavin disputed rumors that he was born into wealth by revealing that he attended a preparatory school and Stanford University on scholarships.

== Career ==
=== Entry into acting ===
Following his naval service Gavin offered himself as a technical adviser to family friend and film producer Bryan Foy, who was making a movie about the Princeton. Instead, Foy arranged a screen test for Gavin with Universal-International. Gavin initially refused the offer, but his father urged him to try it. The test was successful and Gavin signed with the studio. "They offered me so much money I couldn't resist", he said later.

Universal groomed Gavin as a leading man in the mold of Rock Hudson. He trained in Jess Kimmel's talent workshop under the name John Gilmore. His classmates included Grant Williams, Gia Scala, and John Saxon. His first film was Raw Edge (1956), in which he played the brother of Rory Calhoun and was billed as John Gilmore. His name changed to John Gavin for the films Behind the High Wall (1956), Four Girls in Town (1957), and Quantez (also 1957). Gavin was meant to star in The Female Animal (1958) but was too busy on other projects and was replaced by George Nader.

=== Stardom: A Time to Love and a Time to Die ===
Gavin's break was the lead in A Time to Love and a Time to Die (1958), directed by Douglas Sirk from the novel by Erich Maria Remarque. His casting drew comparisons with the casting of the similarly inexperienced Lew Ayres in Universal's film version of All Quiet on the Western Front (1931). Sirk cast Gavin for the young actor's inexperience, fresh looks, and earnest manner. The film was not a success when it was released, although Gavin received praise for his performance.

=== A series of classic films ===
Before A Time to Love and a Time to Die had been released, Gavin was cast by Douglas Sirk to support Lana Turner in Imitation of Life (1959). Unlike his previous film this was a box-office success, and Gavin was voted Most Promising Male Newcomer for his performance in the film by the Motion Picture Exhibitor.

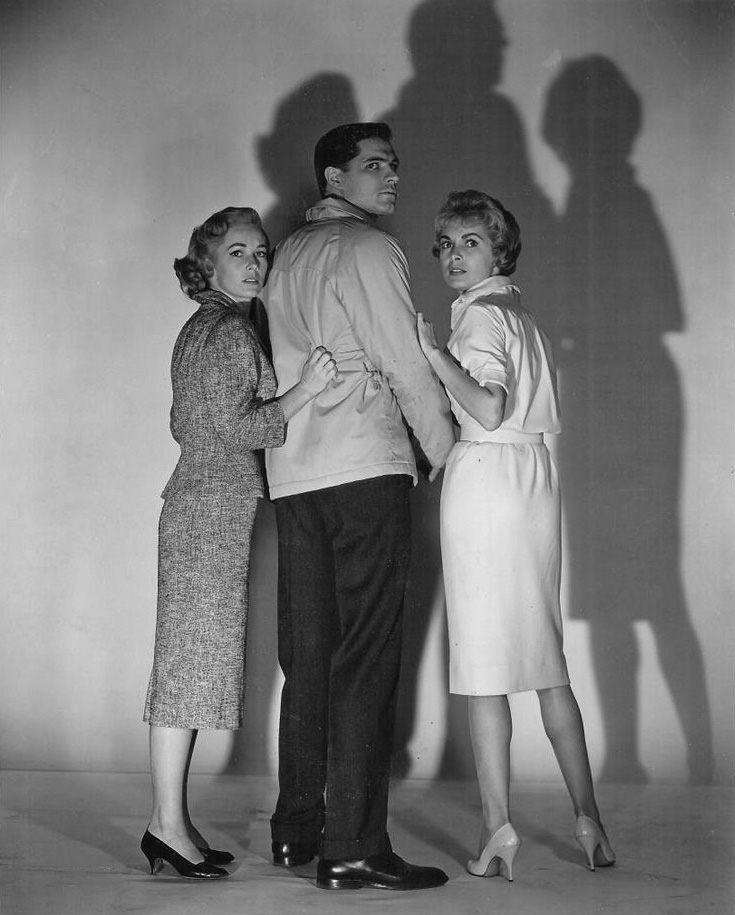
Gavin with actresses Vera Miles (left) and Janet Leigh (right) in a publicity photo for Psycho (1960)

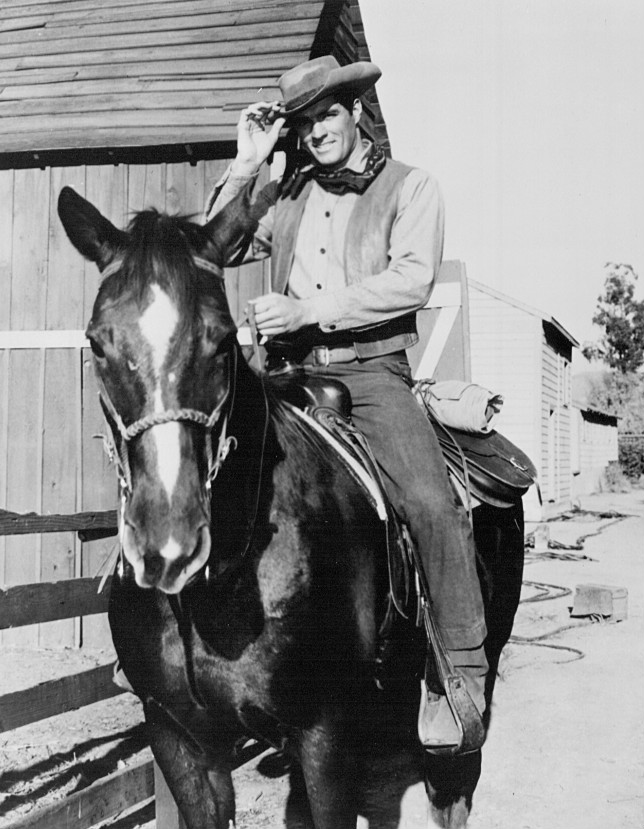
Gavin in the 1964 TV series Destry

Gavin appeared as Julius Caesar in Universal's epic Spartacus (1960), directed by Stanley Kubrick. He was cast as Sam Loomis in the thriller Psycho (1960) for director Alfred Hitchcock. Gavin later claimed he was "terribly disturbed" by the sex and violence in Psycho, saying, "I think Hitch really got frosted with me." Both films were successful, critically and commercially.

Following the success of Imitation of Life, Gavin was often cast as the handsome romantic interest opposite leading ladies but as shallow characters with little to do. He co-starred with Doris Day in the thriller Midnight Lace, Sophia Loren in the comedic A Breath of Scandal (both 1960), Susan Hayward in the melodrama Back Street, and with Sandra Dee in Romanoff and Juliet and Tammy Tell Me True (all 1961). Most of these films were produced by Ross Hunter. He appeared periodically on television in various anthology series. He was directed by a young William Friedkin in the episode "Off Season" (season 10, episode 29) of The Alfred Hitchcock Hour.

Gavin later claimed that he lacked training support from Universal during his early days there:

When I walked through the gate, Universal quit building actors. All of a sudden I was doing leading roles. I knew I was a tyro but they told me to shut up and act. Some of those early roles were unactable. Even Laurence Olivier couldn't have done anything with them. The dialog included cardboard passages such as "I love you. You can rely on me, darling. I'll wait." It was all I could do to keep from adding, "with egg on my face."

Gavin disliked comparisons to Rock Hudson and in a 1960 interview said he considered quitting acting to take up law. He left Universal in 1962. He signed to make several movies in Europe including The Assassins, The Challenge, and Night Call. However, he pulled out of The Assassins (which became Assassins of Rome (1965)), and Night Call and The Challenge were never made. In early 1964 he starred in the TV series Destry. The series was not a ratings success and was cancelled.

=== Return to Universal ===
In September 1964 Gavin signed a new contract with Universal, which gave him the option to take work outside the studio. He appeared in the television series Convoy, which was cancelled after a short run. He was in the Mexican film Pedro Páramo (1967), based on the novel by Juan Rulfo. His next role was that of Mary Tyler Moore's character's stuffy boyfriend in Universal's 1920s-era musical Thoroughly Modern Millie (1967). Gavin saw the role as an opportunity to parody his performances in Ross Hunter films.

In June 1966 Gavin signed a five-year non-exclusive contract with Universal. He was cast as the lead in OSS 117 – Double Agent (1968), then titled No Roses for Robert, replacing Frederick Stafford who was filming Alfred Hitchcock's Topaz. He played supporting roles in The Madwoman of Chaillot (1969) and Pussycat, Pussycat, I Love You (1970), in which he parodied his own image.

=== James Bond ===
Gavin was signed for the role of James Bond in the film Diamonds Are Forever (1971) after George Lazenby left the project. However, David Picker, the head of United Artists, wanted the box-office assurance of Sean Connery. Gavin's contract was honored despite losing the role to Connery. According to Roger Moore's James Bond Diary, Gavin was slated to play Bond in Live and Let Die (1973), but Harry Saltzman insisted on a British actor for the role and Moore was given the part.

=== Screen Actors Guild ===
Gavin was on the board of the Screen Actors Guild (SAG) in 1965. He served a term as third vice president and two terms as president from 1971 to 1973. During his presidency Gavin testified before the Federal Trade Commission on phone talent rackets and met with President Richard Nixon to present the problem of excessive television reruns. He presented petitions to the federal government on the issues of prime-time access rules, legislative assistance for American motion pictures, and film production by the government using non-professional actors.

Gavin's presidency in the Screen Actors Guild came to an end when he was defeated by Dennis Weaver in 1973. Gavin was the first incumbent president to be defeated by an independent challenger.

=== Theatre ===
Gavin made a foray into live theater in the 1970s, showcasing his baritone voice. He toured the summer stock circuit as El Gallo in a production of The Fantasticks at the South Shore Music Circus' twentieth anniversary summer season (June 29 - July 4, 1970) in Massachusetts.

In 1973 Gavin replaced Ken Howard in the Broadway musical Seesaw opposite Michele Lee. Gavin said he first turned down the musical because of his unhappiness with the quality of the book but reconsidered when Michael Bennett asked him to join the cast. He played the role for seven months and toured the United States with Lucie Arnaz. Both the Broadway and touring productions were directed by Michael Bennett.

=== Later TV work ===
In 1973 Gavin played Akhenaten in the television movie Nefertiti y Aquenatos alongside Geraldine Chaplin and Salah Zulfikar. In 1980 Gavin played Cary Grant in the television movie Sophia Loren: Her Own Story. He guest-starred on Mannix, The Love Boat, Medical Center, Hart to Hart, and Fantasy Island.

== Politics ==
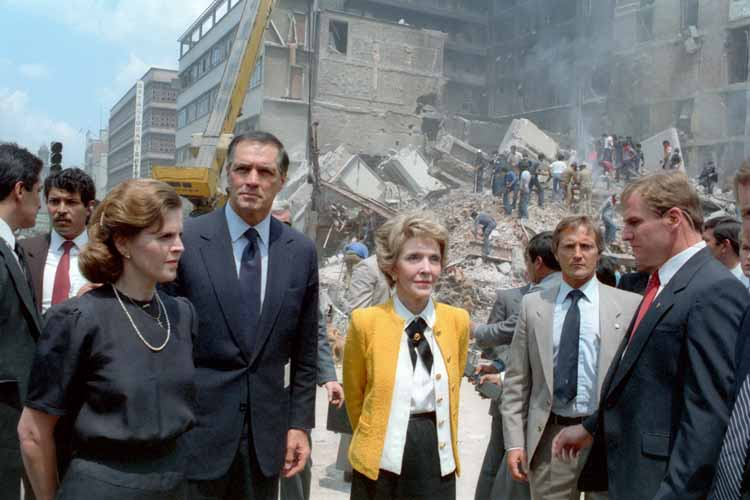
John Gavin with first ladies Paloma Cordero of Mexico (left) and Nancy Reagan of the United States (right) after the 1985 Mexico City earthquake.

Gavin was cultural adviser to the Organization of American States from 1961 to 1965.

=== Ambassador to Mexico ===
A Republican, Gavin was appointed U.S. Ambassador to Mexico in June 1981 by President Ronald Reagan. He met with opposition political parties while being a key defender of the president's anti-communist policies within Central America, for which he received attention and scrutiny. Gavin served until June 1986, when he resigned to go back to private life.

== Business career ==
In June 1986 following his work as ambassador to Mexico, Gavin became vice-president of Atlantic Richfield in federal and international relations. In 1987 he resigned to become president of Univisa Satellite Communications, a subsidiary of Univisa, the Spanish language broadcasting empire.

Gavin was president of Gamma Holdings, a global capital and consulting company which he helped found in 1968. He became chairman of Gamma Services International in January 1990. He served on the boards of Causeway Capital; the Hotchkis & Wiley Funds; the TCW Strategic Income Fund; Securitas Security Services USA, Inc.; DII Industries, LLC; Claxson Interactive Group Inc.; Anvita, Inc.; the Latin America Strategy Board at HM Capital Partners LLC; Apex Mortgage Capital Inc.; Krause's Furniture, Inc.; Atlantic Richfield Co.; International Wire Holdings Company; and International Wire Group Holdings, Inc. Gavin served as senior counselor to Hicks Trans American Partners (a division of Hicks Holdings) and managing director and partner of Hicks, Muse, Tate & Furst (Latin America) from 1994 to 2001. He was an independent trustee of Causeway International Value Fund.

Gavin served on various pro bono boards, including UCLA's Anderson Graduate School of Management, Don Bosco Institute, the FEDCO Charitable Fund, the Hoover Institution, Loyola-Marymount University, the National Parks Foundation, Southwest Museum, the University of the Americas, and Villanova Preparatory School.

== Personal life ==
Gavin was married to Cicely Evans from 1957 until their divorce in 1965. They had two daughters. During the filming of No Roses for OSS 117 in Italy in 1967, Gavin dated co-star Luciana Paluzzi.

In 1974 Gavin married stage and television actress Constance Towers. The two were introduced at a party in 1957 by Gavin's godfather, Jimmy McHugh. Towers had two children from her previous marriage to Eugene McGrath. Gavin and Towers remained married until his death in 2018.

== Death ==
Gavin died of complications from pneumonia after a long battle with leukemia on February 9, 2018, at his home in Beverly Hills.

== Filmography ==
=== Film ===
Year	Title	Role	Notes
1956	Raw Edge	Dan Kirby	Credited as John Gilmore
1956	Behind the High Wall	Johnny Hutchins	Credited as John Golenor
1957	Four Girls in Town	Tom Grant	
1957	Quantez	Teach	
1958	A Time to Love and a Time to Die	Ernst Graeber	
1959	Imitation of Life	Steve Archer	
1960	A Breath of Scandal	Charlie Foster	
1960	Psycho	Sam Loomis	
1960	Spartacus	Julius Caesar	
1960	Midnight Lace	Brian Younger	
1961	Romanoff and Juliet	Igor Romanoff	
1961	Tammy Tell Me True	Thomas "Tom" Freeman	
1961	Back Street	Paul Saxon	
1967	Pedro Páramo	Pedro Páramo	
1967	Thoroughly Modern Millie	Trevor Graydon	
1968	OSS 117 – Double Agent	Hubert Bonisseur de la Bath	
1969	The Madwoman of Chaillot	The Reverend	
1970	Pussycat, Pussycat, I Love You	Charlie Harrison	
1973	Keep It in the Family	Roy McDonald	
1976	House of Shadows	Roland Stewart	
1978	Jennifer	Senator Tremayne	

=== Television ===
Year	Title	Role	Notes
1960	Insight	The Priest	Episode: "The Martyr"
1962	Alcoa Premiere	William Fortnum	Episode: "The Jail"
1963	The Alfred Hitchcock Hour	Dr. Don Reed	Season 1 Episode 31: "Run for Doom"
1964	Destry	Harrison Destry	Main role (13 episodes)
1964	The Virginian	Charles Boulanger / Baker	Episode: "Portrait of a Widow"
1964	Kraft Suspense Theatre	Carlos	Episode: "A Truce to Terror"
1964	Kraft Suspense Theatre	Tom Threepersons	Episode: "Threepersons"
1965	The Alfred Hitchcock Hour	Johnny Kendall	Season 3 Episode 29: "Off Season"
1965	Convoy	Commander Dan Talbot	Main role (13 episodes)
1970	Cutter's Trail	Ben Cutter	Television film
1971	The Doris Day Show	Dr. Forbes	Episode: "Skiing Anyone?"
1973	Nefertiti y Aquenatos	Akhenaten	Television film
1973	Mannix	Arthur Danford	Episode: "The Danford File"
1974	ABC Wide World of Mystery		Episode: "Hard Day at Blue Nose"
1975	The Lives of Jenny Dolan	Officer	Television film
1976	Medical Center	Lieutenant Colonel Halliday	Episode: "Major Annie, MD"
1977	The Love Boat	Dan Barton	Episode: "Silent Night" S1 E11
1978	Fantasy Island	Harry Kellino	Episode: "Family Reunion"
1978	Doctors' Private Lives	Dr. Jeffrey Latimer	Television film
1978	Flying High	Senator James Sinclair	Episode: "South by Southwest"
1978	The New Adventures of Heidi	Dan Wyler	Television film
1979	Doctors' Private Lives	Dr. Jeffrey Latimer	Main role (4 episodes)
1980	Sophia Loren: Her Own Story	Cary Grant	Television film
1980	Hart to Hart	Craig Abernathy	Episode: "Murder, Murder on the Wall"
1981	Fantasy Island	Jack Foster	Episode: "Something Borrowed, Something Blue ..."

=== Theatre credits ===
- The Fantastiks (1967) – Paper Mill Playhouse and The Cape Playhouse on Cape Cod, Massachusetts in 1970
- Seesaw (1974) with Lucie Arnaz – Broadway and tour

Mr. Roberts (1968) - Paper Mill Playhouse

Diplomatic posts
Preceded by Julian Nava	U.S. Ambassador to Mexico; 1981–1986	Succeeded by Charles J. Pilliod, Jr.
