= Charles Page Bryan =

American diplomat and politician

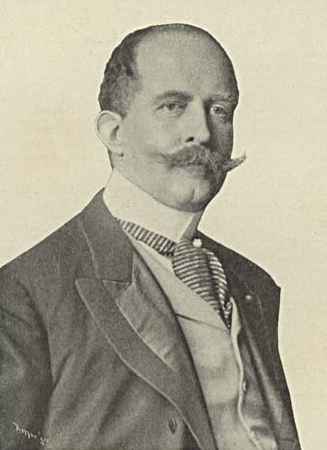
- Charles Page Bryan, 1903

United States Ambassador to Japan
- In office November 22, 1911 – October 1, 1912
- President: William Howard Taft
- Preceded by: Thomas J. O'Brien
- Succeeded by: Larz Anderson

United States Minister to Belgium
- In office February 10, 1910 – September 18, 1911
- President: William Howard Taft
- Preceded by: Henry Lane Wilson
- Succeeded by: Larz Anderson

United States Minister to Portugal
- In office April 25, 1903 – January 16, 1910
- President: Theodore Roosevelt; William Howard Taft
- Preceded by: Francis B. Loomis
- Succeeded by: Henry T. Gage

United States Minister to Brazil
- In office April 11, 1898 – December 3, 1902
- President: William McKinley; Theodore Roosevelt
- Preceded by: Edwin H. Conger
- Succeeded by: David E. Thompson

Member of the Illinois House of Representatives
- In office 1888–1897

Member of the Colorado House of Representatives
- In office 1880

Personal details
- Born: October 2, 1855 Chicago, Illinois, United States
- Died: March 13, 1918 (aged 62) Washington, D. C., US
- Parent: Thomas Barbour Bryan (father)
- Relatives: Jennie Byrd Bryan Payne (sister); Daniel Bryan (grandfather); James Barbour (great-uncle); Philip P. Barbour (great-uncle); Thomas Barbour (great-grandfather); Bryan Lathrop (cousin); Barbour Lathrop (cousin); Florence Lathrop Field Page (cousin); John Barton Payne (brother-in-law)
- Occupation: Lawyer, diplomat

Charles Page Bryan (October 2, 1855 – March 13, 1918) was an American lawyer, politician, and diplomat.

== Biography ==
Bryan was born in Chicago, Illinois, on October 2, 1855. He was the son of Thomas Barbour Bryan. Through his father, he was a member of the esteemed Barbour family. His mother had also been related, by marriage, to the prominent Page and Lee families of Virginia.

Bryan received his preparatory education there, subsequently becoming a student at the University of Virginia and later taking his degree in law at Columbian University (now George Washington University), Washington, D.C. From 1879 to 1883 he practiced his profession in Colorado and also took an active part in politics, being elected and serving as a Republican in the Colorado House of Representatives in 1880. In 1883 he returned to his former home, Chicago, where he soon became a leader in State politics. He served as a member of the Illinois House of Representatives from 1888 to 1897, and also served on the staffs of three successive governors of the State, in each instance with the rank of colonel. In 1891 and 1892 he made tours of Europe in the interest of the World's Columbian Exposition, making the acquaintance of many of the foremost rulers and statesmen of the countries visited.

His diplomatic career really began in 1897, when he was appointed on November 10, 1897 to be minister to China by President William McKinley. He took the oath of office in a recess appointment, but did not officially take office, and his nomination was withdrawn January 5, 1898 before the U.S. Senate acted upon it.

On January 19, he was appointed as envoy to Brazil. He presented his credentials on April 11, 1898. In this role, he laid the firm foundation for the cordial relations between the United States and Brazil. He left the post on December 3, 1902.

On September 2, 1902, he was commissioned during a recess appointment to serve as Minister to Switzerland. He never served under this commission. Months later he was given the more important post of minister to Portugal, where he remained for six years. He was appointed January 7, 1903, and presented his credentials on April 25, 1903. He left the post formally on January 16, 1910.

On December 21, 1909 he was appointed to serve as minister to Belgium. He presented his credentials on February 10, 1910, and left the post on September 18, 1911.

On August 12, 1911 he was appointed ambassador to Japan. He presented his credentials on November 22, 1911, and left office October 1, 1912.

He retired from the diplomatic service in 1912, and later made his home in Washington and Chicago, dividing his time between the two cities. He was a member of the Society of the Cincinnati, of the Society of Foreign Wars, a veteran of the Spanish–American War, and was a member of leading clubs in New York, Washington, and Chicago. He died in Washington, D.C., March 13, 1918. A lifelong bachelor, Bryan had never married. He was buried at the city's Oak Hill Cemetery.
