= Behind the High Wall =

1956 film by Abner Biberman

- Theatrical release poster
- Directed by: Abner Biberman
- Screenplay by: Harold Jack Bloom
- Story by: Richard K. Polimer; Wallace Sullivan
- Produced by: Stanley Rubin
- Starring: Tom Tully; Sylvia Sidney
- Cinematography: Maury Gertsman
- Edited by: Ted J. Kent
- Color process: Black and white
- Production company: Universal International Pictures
- Distributed by: Universal Pictures
- Release date: July 1956 (USA)
- Running time: 85 minutes
- Country: United States
- Language: English

Behind the High Wall is a 1956 American film noir crime film directed by Abner Biberman starring Tom Tully and Sylvia Sidney.

It featured an early performance by John Gavin who had just signed with Universal. It was sometimes referred to as his first film although he had appeared in Raw Edge under another name. In March 1956 it was said "John Gilmore" was in the film but in the credits he is called "John Gavin".

== Plot ==
Inmates pull a prison break, taking the warden and another prisoner as hostages. But when the car gets into a crash, killing the others, the warden makes off with the gang's loot and places the blame on the other hostage.

== Cast ==
- Tom Tully as Warden Carmichael
- Sylvia Sidney as Hilda Carmichael
- Betty Lynn as Anne MacGregor
- John Gavin as Johnny Hutchins
- Don Beddoe as Todd MacGregor
- John Larch as William Kiley
- Barney Phillips as Tom Renolds
- Ed Kemmer as Charlie Rains
- John Beradino as Carl Burkhardt
- Rayford Barnes as George Miller
- Nicky Blair as Roy Burkhardt
- David Garcia as Morgan
- Peter Leeds as First Detective
- James Hyland as Second Detective (as Jim Hyland)
