= United States involvement in the Mexican Revolution =

- Part of the Mexican Revolution, Banana Wars, and World War I
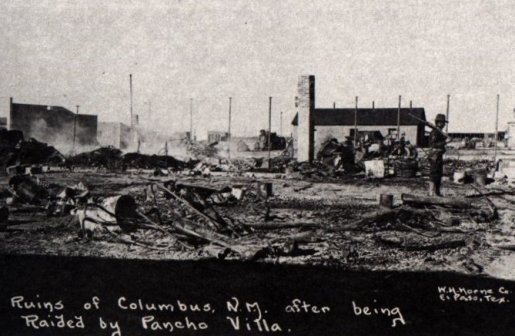
- Aftermath of Pancho Villa's attack on Columbus, New Mexico, in 1916
Date	1910–1919
Location	Mexico, United States
Result	Pancho Villa Expedition

Belligerents
United States Supported by: United Kingdom (1916–1918); France (1916–1918)	Mexico Maderistas; Huertistas; Villistas; Constitutionalistas; Carrancistas Supported by: Germany (c. 1913–1918)

Commanders and leaders
(United States) William Howard Taft (United States) Woodrow Wilson (United States) John J. Pershing; Frank Friday Fletcher	Francisco Madero; Victoriano Huerta; Pancho Villa; Venustiano Carranza; Alvaro Obregon

The United States involvement in the Mexican Revolution was varied and seemingly contradictory, first supporting and then repudiating Mexican regimes during the period of 1910–1920. For both economic and political reasons, the U.S. government generally supported those who occupied the seats of power, but could withhold official recognition. The U.S. supported the regime of Mexican President Porfirio Díaz (1876–1880; 1884–1911) after initially withholding recognition since he came to power by coup. In 1909, Díaz and U.S. President William Howard Taft met in Ciudad Juárez, across the border from El Paso, Texas. Prior to the inauguration of Woodrow Wilson on March 4, 1913, the U.S. government focused on just warning the Mexican military that decisive action from the U.S. military would take place if the lives and the property of U.S. nationals living in the country were endangered. President Taft sent more troops to the U.S.-Mexico border but did not allow them to intervene directly in the conflict, a move which Congress opposed. Twice during the Revolution, the U.S. sent troops into Mexico, to occupy Veracruz in 1914 and to northern Mexico in 1916 in a failed attempt to capture Pancho Villa. U.S. foreign policy toward Latin America was to assume the region was the sphere of influence of the U.S., articulated in the Monroe Doctrine. However, the U.S. role in the Mexican Revolution was limited. It did not directly intervene in the Mexican Revolution in a sustained manner.

During Díaz's long rule, he implemented policies aimed at modernization and economic development, inviting foreign entrepreneurs to invest in Mexico. The regime passed laws favorable to investors. American business interests invested large amounts of capital, particularly along the U.S.-Mexico border, during the decades of Díaz's rule. There was close economic cooperation between the two governments, which was predicated on Diaz's cooperation with U.S. investors. In 1908, Díaz stated he would not run for re-election in 1910; the statement gave rise to politicking of potential candidates. Díaz reversed himself, ran for re-election, and jailed the leading opposition candidate, Francisco I. Madero. Madero escaped Mexico and took refuge in San Antonio, Texas, and called for nullification of the 1910 elections, declared himself as provisional president, and asked for support from the Mexican people. His Plan of San Luis Potosí sparked revolutionary uprisings, particularly in Mexico's north. The U.S. stayed out of the unfolding events until March 6, 1911, when President Taft mobilized forces on the U.S.-Mexico border. "In effect this was an intervention in Mexican politics, and to Mexicans it meant the United States had condemned Díaz."

After Díaz was forced to resign in 1911 and Francisco I. Madero was elected president in October 1911, President Taft was a lame duck, having lost the presidential election of 1912. Until the inauguration of Woodrow Wilson in March 1913, Taft's Ambassador to Mexico, Henry Lane Wilson actively sought to oust democratically elected Mexican president Madero. Lane Wilson was initially sympathetic to the Madero regime, but quickly came into conflict with it and conspired with General Victoriano Huerta to oust Madero. The anti-Madero coup took place in February 1913, known as the Ten Tragic Days, which saw the forced resignations of Madero and his vice president, followed immediately by their murders. Under President Woodrow Wilson, the United States government refused to recognize Huerta's government.

President Wilson sent troops to occupy Veracruz, with the dispute defused through a peace conference in Canada. Anti-Huerta forces in the north under Venustiano Carranza and in the south under Emiliano Zapata forced the resignation of Huerta in July 1914. A civil war between Carranza and Zapata broke out in 1915, with the U.S. recognizing Carranza's Constitutionalist faction. The U.S. supplied arms to Carranza's army. Pancho Villa was at first supported by Washington, but he was defeated and lost most of his support. He was angered by the U.S. switch to recognition of his rival. To draw the U.S. into Mexico he attacked the border village of Columbus, New Mexico, killing U.S. citizens in 1916. The U.S. Army under Gen. John J. Pershing pursued him in a punitive mission, known as the Pancho Villa Expedition, but failed to capture him. Carranza demanded the U.S. to withdraw across the border.

== Diplomatic relations in the Díaz era ==
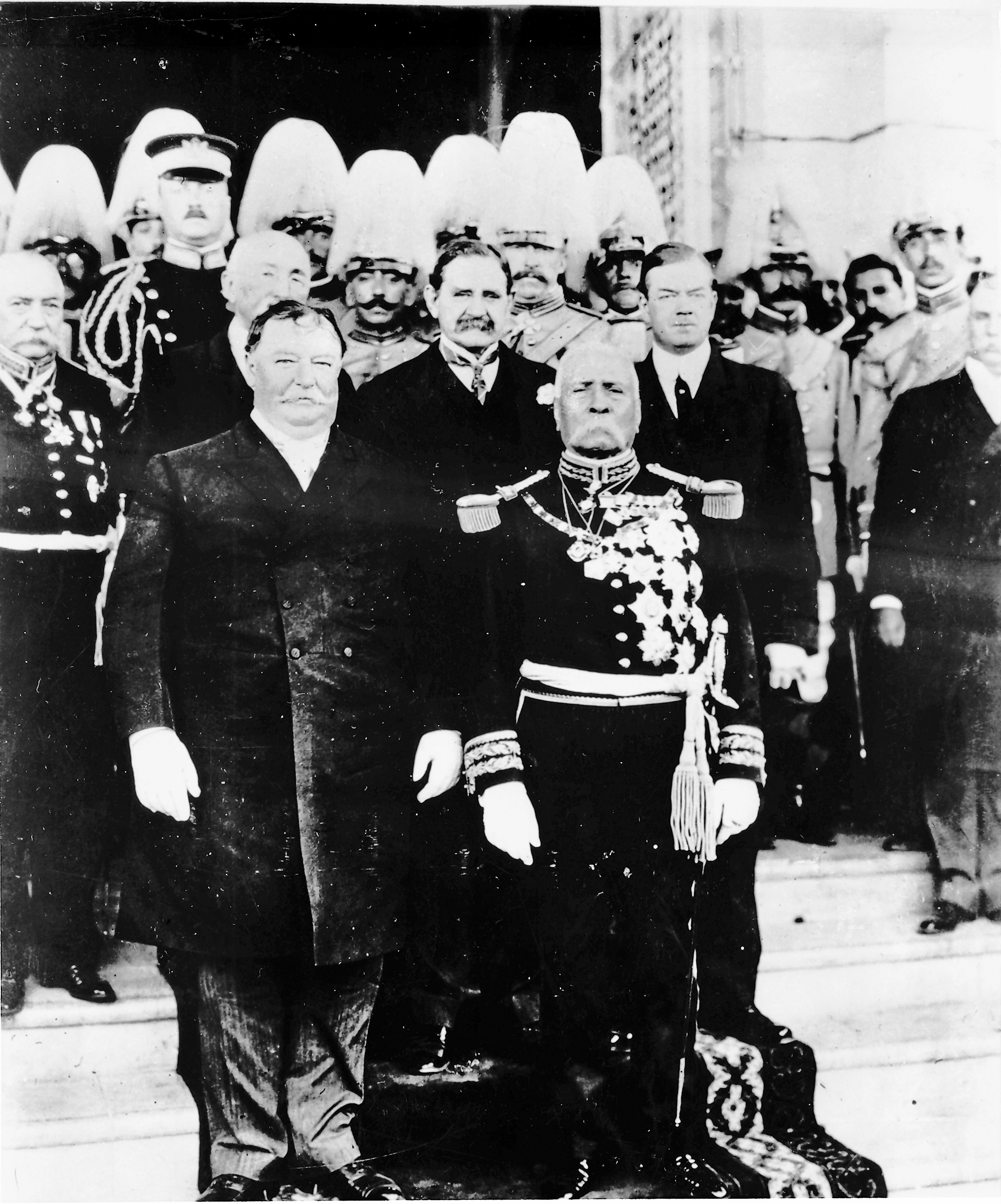
Taft and Porfirio Díaz, Ciudad Juárez, Mexico, 1909

Díaz opened Mexico to foreign investment of Britain, France, Germany, and most especially the United States. Mexico–United States relations during Díaz's presidency were generally strong, although he began to strengthen ties with Great Britain, Germany, and France to offset U.S. power and influence. Mexico was extremely important to U.S. business interests and Taft saw Díaz as key to protecting those investments. Taft met Díaz in person on the U.S.-Mexico border in 1909, an historic event in itself since it was the first trip of a sitting U.S. president to Mexico. It was a way for the U.S. to signal its continuing support of Díaz, despite his advancing age. Taft said: "we have two billions American capital in Mexico that will be greatly endangered if Díaz were to die and his government go to pieces."

Despite the importance of Mexico to U.S. business interests, the U.S. had "a history of incompetent diplomatic representation." According to one scholar, the Taft administration's appointment of Henry Lane Wilson as ambassador "continued the tradition of incompetence."

During the presidency of Porfirio Díaz, documents from the U.S. Consulate in Mexico kept the Secretary of State in Washington, D.C. informed about Mexican affairs. The Secretary of State told President Taft about possible regime change when Díaz was unable to control rebellions in various areas of Mexico. Taft wanted to keep the Díaz government in power to prevent problems with U.S. access to Mexican resources, especially oil.

== The U.S. and President Madero, 1911–1913 ==
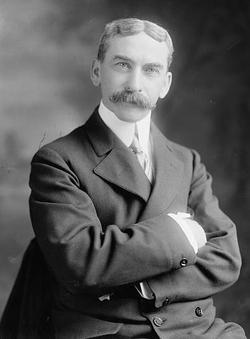
Henry Lane Wilson, U.S. Ambassador to Mexico

President Taft's Ambassador to Mexico Henry Lane Wilson was a key player in the overthrow of the President of Mexico, Francisco I. Madero. From the start of Madero's presidency, Ambassador Wilson was opposed to Madero and actively sought U.S. intervention in Mexico. Wilson controlled information and disinformation that he sent to the U.S. Department of State, so that the government did not have a clear understanding of the situation. Wilson stirred up trouble in the capital by feeding disinformation to local newspapers, and then when Madero reacted by censoring them, they played the victim of an unreasonable president. Madero came to office by a free and fair election after revolutionary forces made then President Porfirio Díaz's position untenable. A treaty was signed between rebels and representatives of Díaz in May 1911. Its provisions were that Díaz resign and go into exile, an interim government installed, and new elections called for November 1911. Madero acted against advice of his rebel supporters and dissolved their forces. He retained the Federal Army, which had just been defeated.

Madero was only in office a month when General Bernardo Reyes, a close advisor to President Díaz but then dropped from patronage, rebelled. Reyes had been across the U.S. border in Texas, came to Mexico calling on the people to rise against Madero. His rebellion was a complete failure. Madero had just been elected with a huge popular vote. For the moment the U.S. was optimistic that Madero's regime should be supported. Reyes bowed to the evidence that his rebellion was a failure and was arrested and imprisoned.

Once in office, Madero did not fulfill promises of his Plan of San Luis Potosí concerning land reform, resulting in a peasant rebellion in Morelos led by Emiliano Zapata, a former rebel supporter. For the U.S., this rebellion had little importance, since there were not U.S. investments there, but Madero's seeming inability to put down the rebellion cast doubt on his leadership.

A serious insurrection against Madero was led by Pascual Orozco, who had helped achieve victory for rebels in the north. Orozco was disappointed that he was marginalized once Madero was installed in the presidency and did not move on land reform. He rebelled in the north and posed a greater challenge to Madero. His rebellion was financed by large U.S. businesses as well as Mexicans seeking to destabilized Madero's regime, but the U.S. government seems to have aided or impeded Orozco's uprising. It was suppressed by the Mexican Federal

General Félix Díaz had not gone into exile wíth his uncle Porfirio's family, but launched a rebellion in October 1912, with some support by the U.S. government. He appealed to all those who sought a return to the order and progress. Díaz had the magic family name, but he lacked the military or political skill of his uncle Porfirio. A leading U.S. businessman in Mexico wrote a recommendation for Félix Díaz to Leonard Wood, who served with Theodore Roosevelt as a Rough Rider in Cuba, and was now the head of the U.S. Army General Staff: "[Félix] Díaz can be Mexico's 'man on a white horse' if the U.S. helps him come to power. With the moral support of the U.S. he would be able to change the situation in Mexico in such a way that an [U.S.] intervention will not be necessary." Although if there were a reply to this recommendation, it is not currently extant. But the U.S. did send ships to the Gulf Coast at the time of Díaz's rebellion in Veracruz in October 1912. The German Ambassador Hintze reported that "With the outbreak of the Díaz revolution in Veracruz, the American embassary, without any notification of other missions, officially informed the Mexican government the that American government would opposed bombardment of Veracruz by government troops." Despite explicit U.S. support, Díaz's rebellion was a dismal failure. He was arrested and imprisoned. The U.S. continued to view him as the best option for the replacement of Madero, a course on which it was now set.

Madero was perceived unable to achieve order and stability that the U.S. government and businesses required. Wilson made it clear that he wanted Madero replaced and a candidate more amendable to the U.S. installed in the presidency. General Bernardo Reyes also sought regime change. Both men were imprisoned by Madero, but not executed and went on to lead a coup d'état with support of the U.S. Ambassador. Given activist U.S. interventions in Latin American internal affairs for decades, it was not out of the question that the U.S. would intervene in Mexico in this unsettled period. When that did not happen, the ambassador played a decisive role in undermining the Mexican public's and international diplomatic corps' as well as business interests' perception of the Madero's regime's ability to keep order. From January 1913, a coup against Madero seemed inevitable, supported by the U.S. The plot by Díaz and Reyes against Madero was sprung in February 1913 in a coup d'état during a period now known as the Ten Tragic Days (la decena trágica). which overthrew Madero. Wilson brought Félix Díaz and the head of the Mexican Federal Army, General Victoriano Huerta, who had ostensibly been a defender of the president but now in opposition to him. A signed agreement signed on 19 February, the Pact of the Embassy, laid out a power-sharing agreement between the two Mexican generals, with the explicit support of the U.S. ambassador. U.S. President William Howard Taft, who had appointed Wilson in 1909 as ambassador to Mexico, was a lame duck president, having lost the election to Woodrow Wilson. The new president would be inaugurated on March 4, 1913. In the final days of his presidency, President Madero, at long last and too late realized the tenuousness of his hold on power. He appealed to President-elect Wilson to intervene on his behalf, but to no avail, since Wilson was not yet in office. Ambassador Wilson had secured the support of the foreign diplomatic corps in Mexico, especially the British, German, and French envoys, for the coup and lobbied for U.S. recognition of the new head of state, General Huerta.

== U.S. and the Huerta regime, 1913–1914 ==
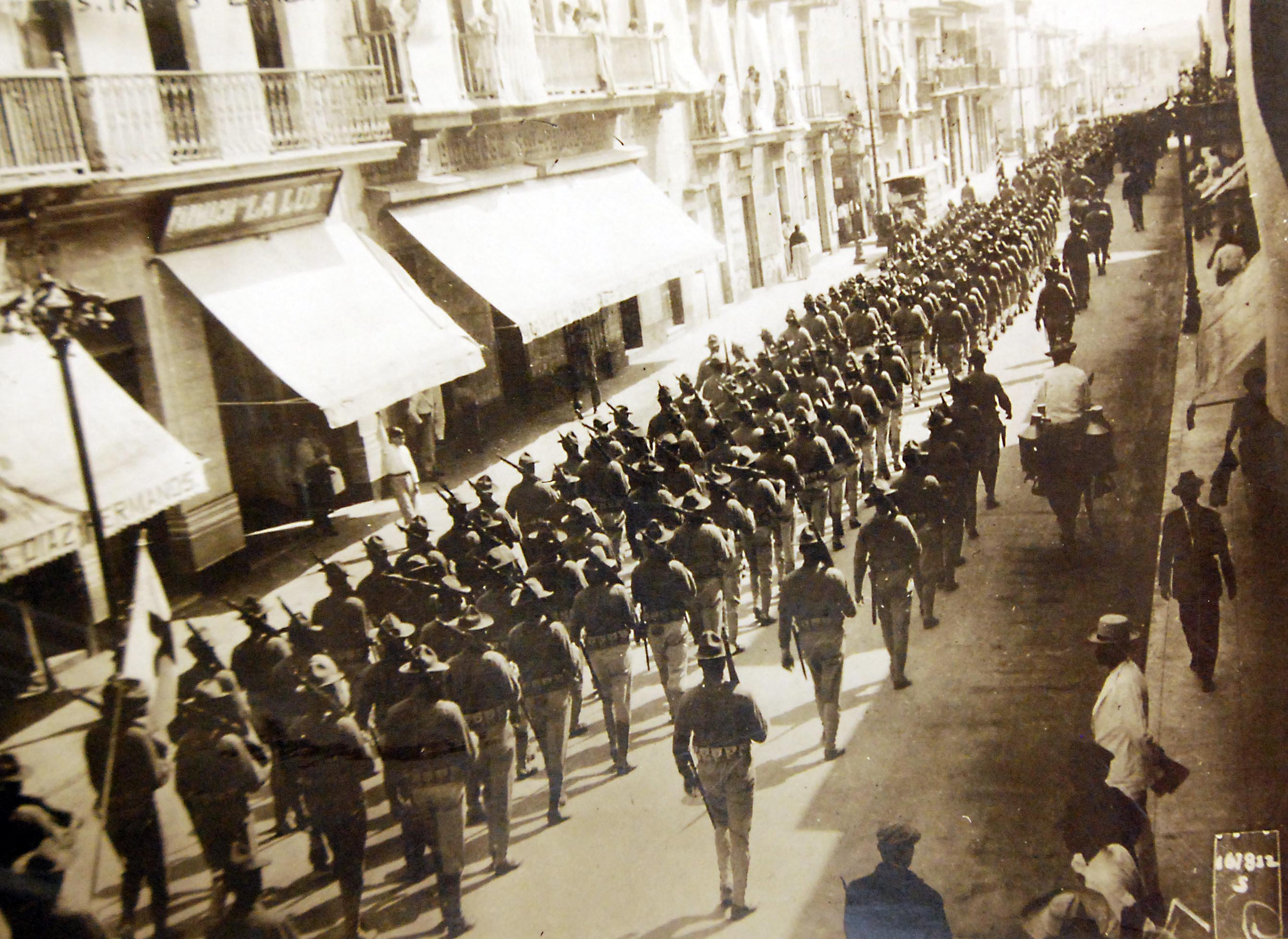
U.S. troops enter Veracruz in April 1914

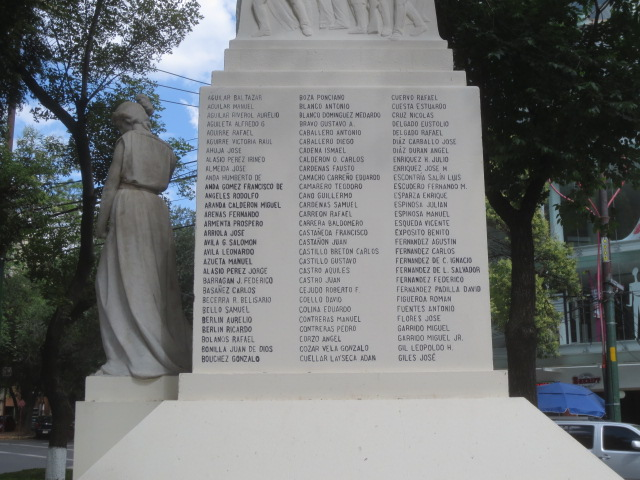
"Defensores de Veracruz" Memorial in Mexico City. This monument celebrates the Mexican defenders of Veracruz in 1914.

Woodrow Wilson was inaugurated president in March 1913, but the coup d'état in Mexico was an established fact, with the democratically elected president Madero murdered and his family in exile. President Wilson did not recognize Huerta as the legitimate head of the Mexican government, and from March to October 1913, Wilson pressured Huerta to resign. Wilson urged the European powers to refrain from recognizing Huerta's government. Huerta announced elections with himself as a candidate. In August 1913, Wilson imposed an arms embargo on Huerta's regime, reversing his previous easy access to arms. In late August Huerta withdrew his name from consideration as a presidential candidate, and his foreign minister Federico Gamboa stood for election. The U.S. was enthusiastic about Gamboa's candidacy and supported the new regime, but not Huerta himself. The U.S. pressured revolutionary opponents, including the newly emerged anti-Huerta leader Venustiano Carranza, to sign on to support a potential new Gamboa government. Carranza refused.

A series of rebellions broke out in Mexico against Huerta's regime, especially in the North (Sonora, Chihuahua, and Coahuila), where the U.S. allowed arms sales to the revolutionaries. Fighting continued in Morelos under Emiliano Zapata, but the conflict there was a regional one with no U.S. involvement. Unlike the brief rebellions that helped bring Madero to power in 1910–1911, Mexico descended into civil war, with the U.S. backing revolutionary factions in the north. The involvement of the U.S. in larger conflicts with its diplomatic and economic rivals in Mexico, particularly Great Britain and Germany, meant that foreign powers affected the way the Mexican situation played out, even if they did not intervene militarily.

When U.S. agents discovered that the German merchant ship, the Ypiranga, was carrying arms to Huerta's regime, President Wilson ordered troops to the port of Veracruz to stop the ship from docking. The U.S. did not declare war on Mexico but the U.S. troops carried out a skirmish against Huerta's forces in Veracruz. The Ypiranga managed to dock at another port, which infuriated Wilson.

On April 9, 1914, Mexican officials in the port of Tampico, Tamaulipas, arrested a rioting group of U.S. sailors—including at least one taken from on board his ship, and thus from U.S. territory. After Mexico refused to apologize in the terms that the U.S. had demanded, the U.S. Navy bombarded the port of Veracruz and occupied Veracruz for seven months. Woodrow Wilson's actual motivation was his desire to protect U.S. oil interests and to overthrow Huerta, whom he refused to recognize as Mexico's leader; the Tampico Affair did succeed in further destabilizing Huerta's regime and encouraging the revolutionary opponents. The ABC Powers (Argentina, Brazil, and Chile) arbitrated, in the Niagara Falls peace conference, held in Ontario, Canada, and U.S. troops left Mexican soil, averting an escalation of the conflict to war.

== U.S. and the warring revolutionary factions, 1914–1915 ==
With the resignation and exile of Huerta, the revolutionary factions had no common enemy. The initially sought to work out a post-Huerta agreement, but it devolved into a civil war of the winners. The U.S. continued to seek influence over the outcome of events in Mexico, but it was unclear how it would do so.

== 1916–1917 ==
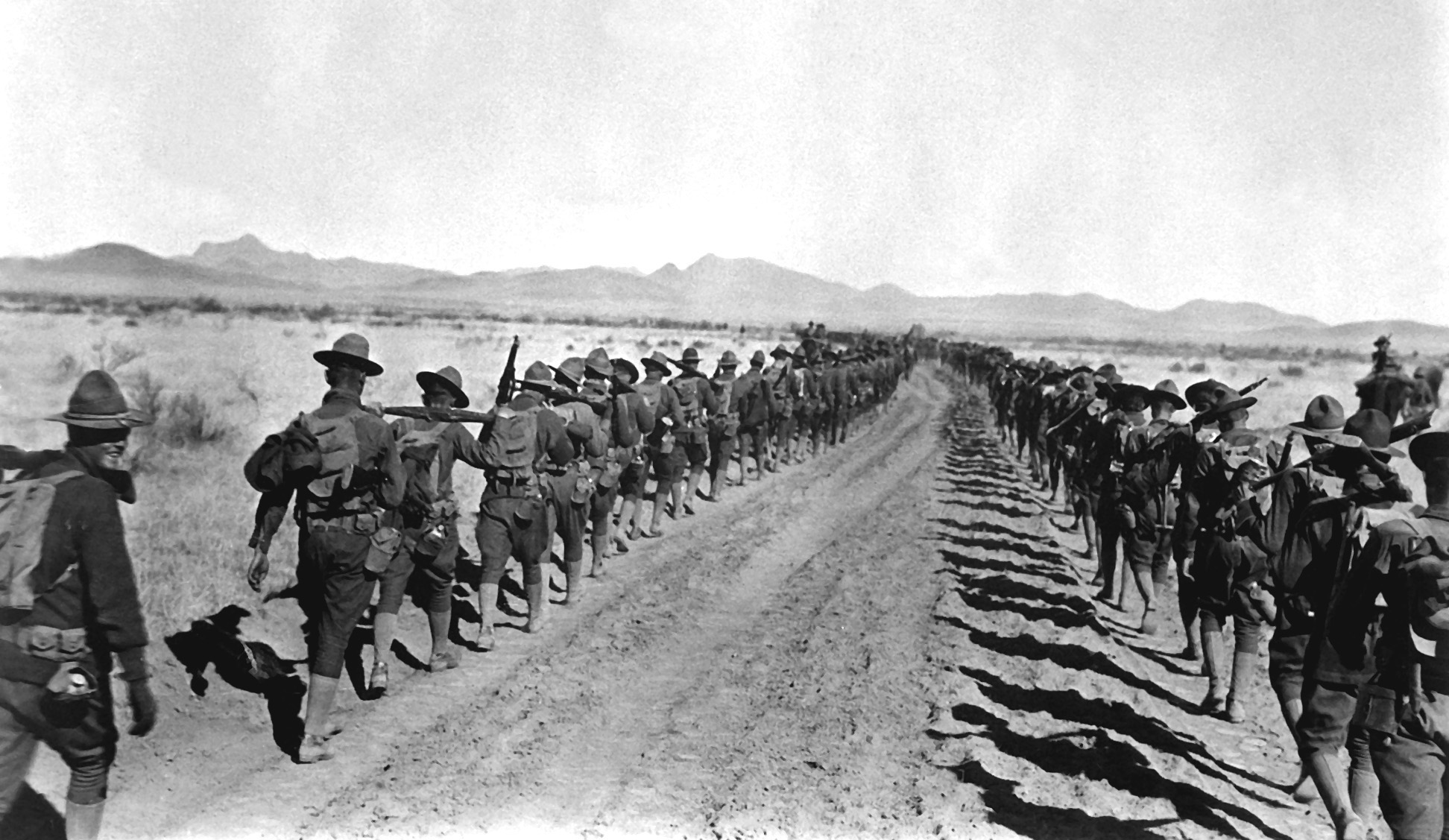
United States Army troops returning to the U.S. in 1917

An increasing number of border incidents early in 1916 culminated in an invasion of American territory on 8 March 1916, when Francisco (Pancho) Villa and his band of 500 to 1,000 men raided Columbus, New Mexico, burning army barracks and robbing stores. In the United States, Villa came to represent mindless violence and banditry. Elements of the 13th Cavalry regiment repulsed the attack, but 14 soldiers and ten civilians were killed. Brig. Gen. John J. Pershing immediately organized a punitive expedition of about 10,000 soldiers to try to capture Villa. They spent 11 months (March 1916 – February 1917) unsuccessfully chasing him, though they did manage to destabilize his forces. A few of Villa's top commanders were also captured or killed during the expedition. The 7th, 10th, 11th, and 13th Cavalry regiments, 6th and U.S. 16th Infantry Regiments, part of the U.S. 6th Field Artillery, and supporting elements crossed the border into Mexico in mid-March, followed later by the 5th Cavalry, 17th and 24th Infantry Regiment (United States), and engineer and other units. Pershing was subject to orders which required him to respect the sovereignty of Mexico, and was further hindered by the fact that the Mexican government and people resented the invasion and demanded its recall. Advance elements of the expedition penetrated as far as Parral, some 400 miles (640 km) south of the border, but Villa was never captured. The campaign consisted primarily of dozens of brief skirmishes with small bands of insurgents. There were even clashes with Mexican Army units; the most serious was on 21 June 1916 at the Battle of Carrizal, where a detachment of the 10th Cavalry was nearly destroyed. War would probably have been declared but for the critical situation in Europe. Even so, virtually the entire regular army was involved, and most of the National Guard had been federalized and concentrated on the border before the end of the affair. Normal relations with Mexico were restored eventually by diplomatic negotiation, and the troops were withdrawn from Mexico in February 1917.

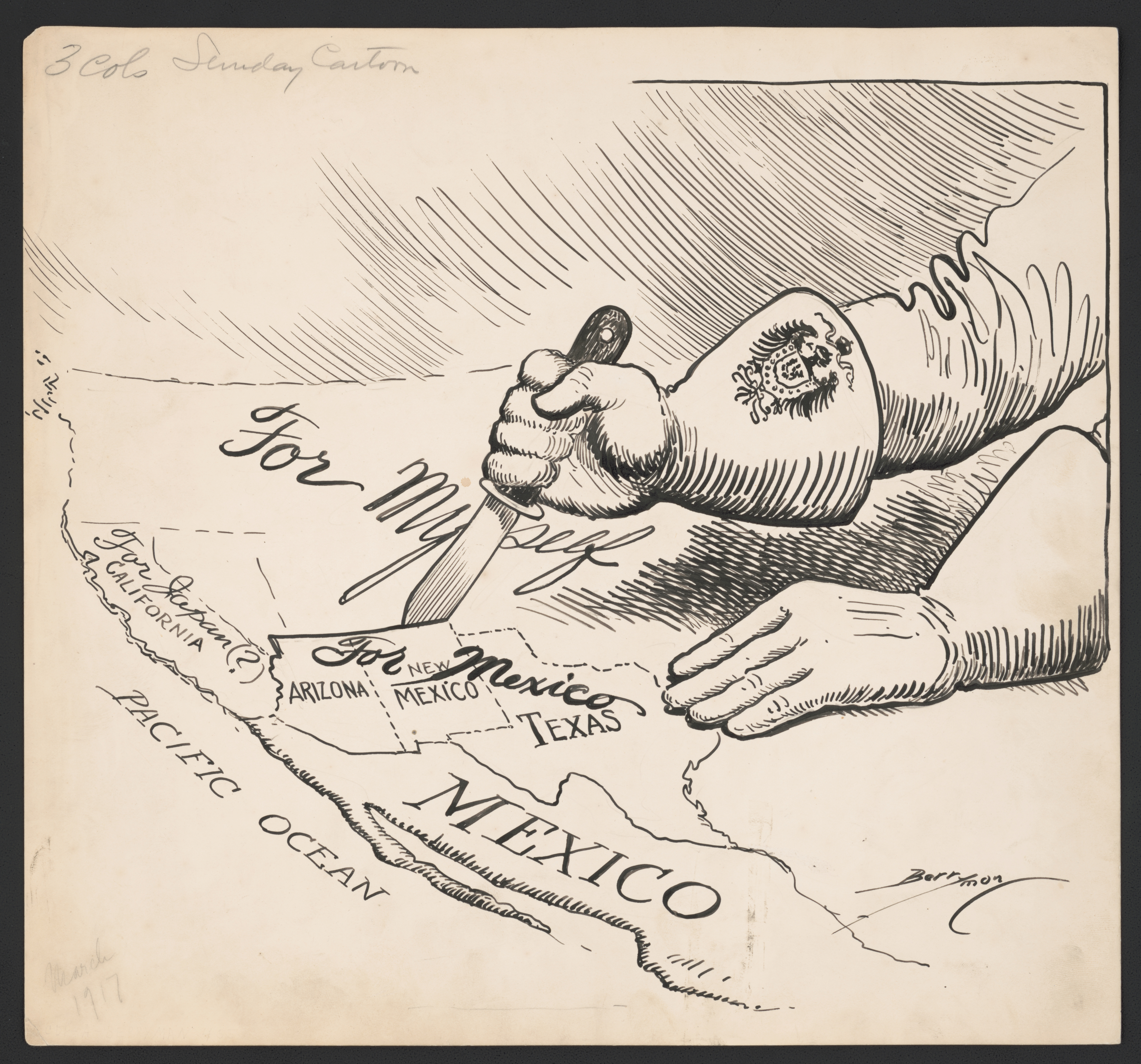
1917 political cartoon about the Zimmermann Telegram

Germany was a rival of the U.S. for influence in Mexico. As World War I raged in Europe, Germany was concerned that the U.S. would enter on the side of the British and French. Germany sought to tie down U.S. troops by fomenting war between the U.S. and Mexico. Germany sent a telegram in code outlining a plan to aid Mexico in such a conflict and Mexico's reward would be to regain land lost to the U.S. in the Mexican American War (1846–48). The Zimmermann Telegram was intercepted and decoded by the British and given to Wilson, who then made public. Carranza, whose faction had benefited from U.S. support and then diplomatic recognition, was not drawn into the conflict. Mexico was neutral during World War I, which was a means for Mexico to carve out a role independent of the U.S. as well as the European powers.

The Constitutionalists who had won power in 1915-16 drafted a new constitution, adopted in February 1917. For foreign business interests the constitution was alarming, since it empowered the Mexican government to expropriate property deemed in the national interest and asserted rights to subsoil resources, which foreign petroleum companies saw as a direct threat to their interests. More radical elements of the revolution succeeded in having these provisions included, but Carranza did not implement them. U.S. business interests sought the support of the U.S. government against this threat to their enterprises, but Wilson did not act on their behalf.

== 1918–1919 ==
Minor clashes with Mexican irregulars, as well as Mexican Federales, continued to disturb the U.S.-Mexican border from 1917 to 1919. Although the Zimmermann Telegram affair of January 1917 did not lead to a direct U.S. intervention, it took place against the backdrop of the Constitutional Convention and exacerbated tensions between the U.S. and Mexico. Military engagements took place near Buenavista, Sonora, on 1 December 1917; in San Bernardino Canyon, Chihuahua, on 26 December 1917; near La Grulla, Texas, on 9 January 1918; at Pilares, Mexico, about 28 March 1918; at the town of Nogales on the Sonora–Arizona border on 27 August 1918; and near El Paso, Texas, on 16 June 1919.

== Foreign mercenaries in Mexico ==
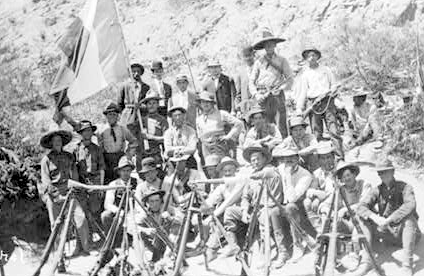
Members of Pancho Villa's American Legion of Honor

Many adventurers, ideologues and freebooters from outside Mexico were attracted by the purported excitement and romance of the Mexican Revolution. Most mercenaries served in armies operating in the north of Mexico, partly because those areas were the closest to popular entry points to Mexico from the U.S., and partly because Pancho Villa had no compunction about hiring mercenaries. The first legion of foreign mercenaries, during the 1910 Madero revolt, was the Falange de los Extranjeros (Foreign Phalanx), which included Giuseppe ("Peppino") Garibaldi, grandson of the famed Italian unifier, as well as many American recruits.

Later, during the revolt against the coup d'état of Victoriano Huerta, many of the same foreigners and others were recruited and enlisted by Pancho Villa and his División del Norte. Villa recruited Americans, Canadians and other foreigners of all ranks from simple infantrymen on up, but the most highly prized and best paid were machine gun experts such as Sam Dreben, artillery experts such as Ivor Thord-Gray, and doctors for Villa's celebrated Servicio sanitario medic and mobile hospital corps. There is little doubt that Villa's Mexican equivalent of the French Foreign Legion (known as the "Legion of Honor") was an important factor in Villa's successes against Huerta's Federal Army.

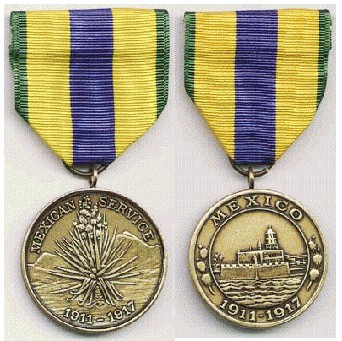
Mexican Service Medal

== U.S. military decorations ==
The U.S. military awarded the Mexican Service Medal to its troops for service in Mexico. The streamer is yellow with a blue center stripe and a narrow green stripe on each edge. The green and yellow recalls the Aztec standard carried at the Battle of Otumba in 1520, which carried a gold sun surrounded by the green plumes of the quetzal. The blue color alludes to the United States Army and refers to the Rio Grande separating Mexico from the United States.

== See also ==
- Mexican Revolution
- Mexico–United States relations

== Gallery ==
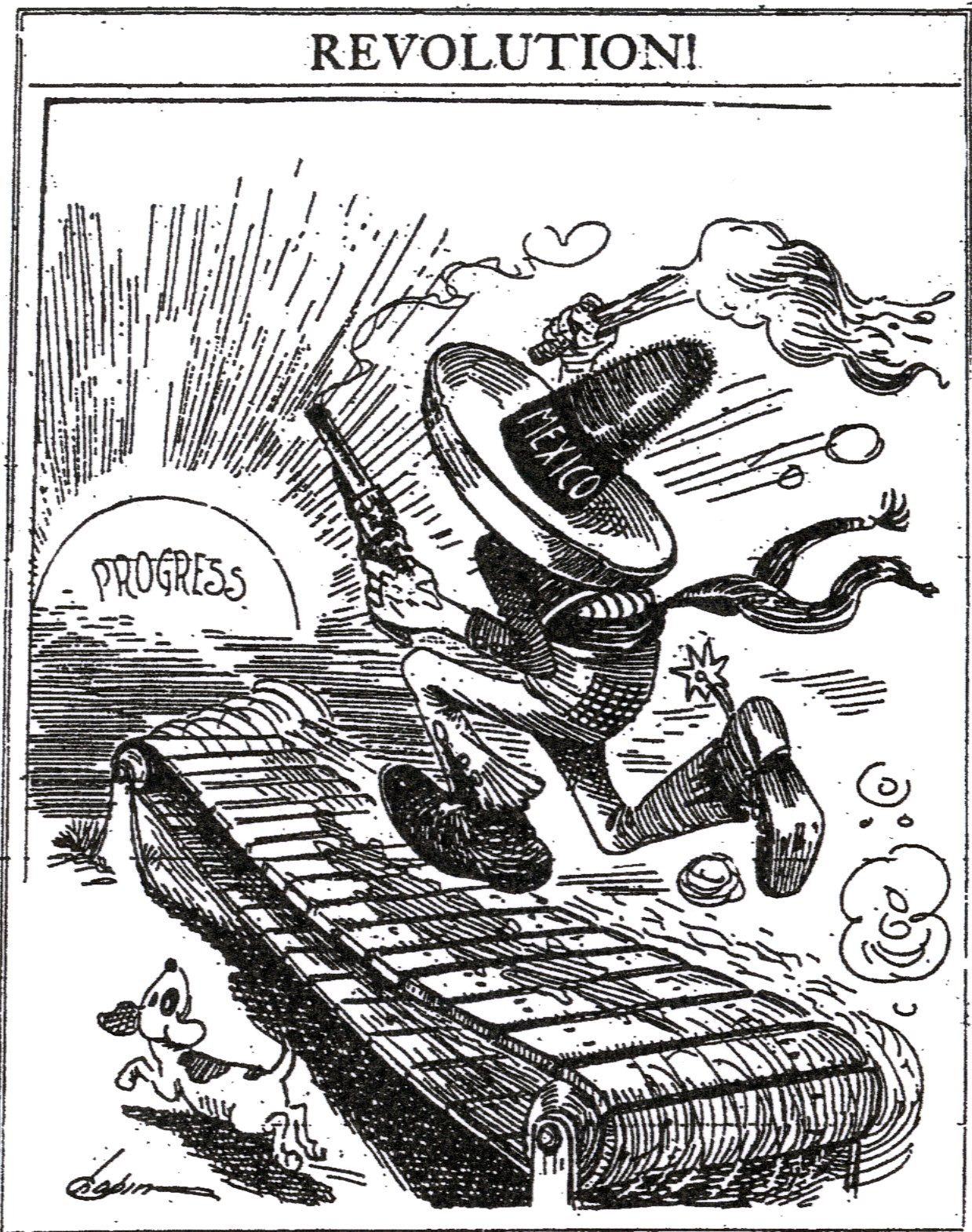
Mexico's fruitless pursuit of progress, where "lots of energy [is] expended but [there is]…no discernible forward progress." It suggests that until Mexico willingly forgoes violence (the pistol) and anarchy (the torch), they will remain stagnant. (San Francisco Examiner 1913)

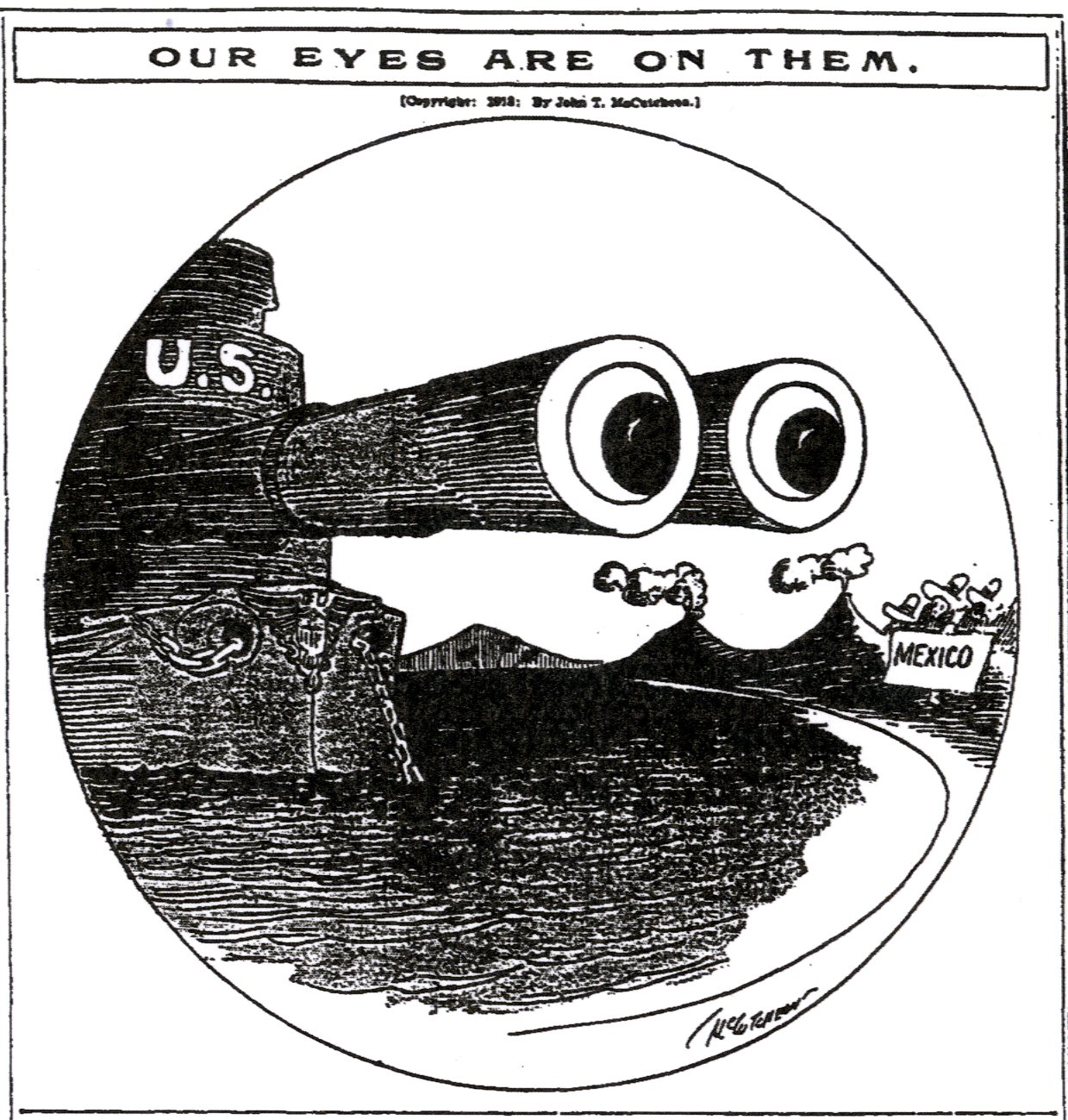
The United States are ever watchful over the presumed chaos in Mexico (Chicago Tribune 1913)
