= Cuban Pacification Medal (Army) =

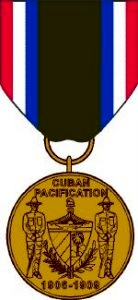
- Type: Service medal
- Awarded for: Service in the Cuban Pacification
- Presented by: Department of War
- Status: Obsolete
- Established: 11 May 1909
- First award: 6 October 1906
- Final award: 1 April 1909
- Ribbon

The Cuban Pacification Medal (Army) is a military award of the United States Army which was created by orders of the United States War Department on May 11, 1909. The medal was created to recognize service during the United States occupation of Cuba from 1906 to 1909.

To be awarded the Cuban Pacification Medal (Army), a service member was required to serve in the United States occupation force, garrisoned on the island of Cuba between October 6, 1906, and April 1, 1909. The Cuban Pacification Medal (Navy) was also issued to naval personnel who served ashore in Cuba between September 12, 1906, and April 1, 1909, or who were attached to any of a number of ships serving in the area within this timeframe.

There was no minimum service time required for presentation of the award, and a service member could technically receive the Cuban Pacification Medal for only a few days of service.

A similar decoration, known as the Army of Cuban Occupation Medal, also existed for those who had served in the initial occupation of Cuba after the Spanish–American War.

Colonel Harland Sanders was awarded the medal for his service as an army Wagoner in Cuba from 1906 to 1907.
