= Henry Lane Wilson =

American diplomat (1857–1932)

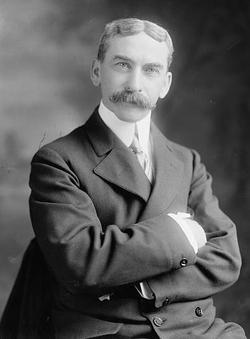
- Wilson c. 1890

United States Ambassador to Mexico
- In office March 5, 1910 – July 17, 1913
- President: William Howard Taft; Woodrow Wilson
- Preceded by: David E. Thompson
- Succeeded by: Henry P. Fletcher

United States Minister to Belgium
- In office May 5, 1905 – December 25, 1909
- President: Theodore Roosevelt; William Howard Taft
- Preceded by: Lawrence Townsend
- Succeeded by: Charles Page Bryan

United States Minister to Chile
- In office September 14, 1897 – July 18, 1904
- President: William McKinley; Theodore Roosevelt
- Preceded by: Edward H. Strobel
- Succeeded by: John Hicks

Personal details
- Born: November 3, 1857 Crawfordsville, Indiana, U.S.
- Died: December 22, 1932 (aged 75) Indianapolis, Indiana, U.S.
- Resting place: Crown Hill Cemetery and Arboretum, Section 2, Lot 2; 39.8175767°N 86.171337°W
- Spouse: Alice Vajen (m. 1885)
- Relations: John L. Wilson (brother)
- Parent: James Wilson (father)
- Education: Wabash College
- Occupation: Attorney; journalist
- Known for: Involvement in the assassination of Francisco I. Madero

Henry Lane Wilson (November 3, 1857 – December 22, 1932) was an American attorney, journalist, and diplomat who served successively as United States Minister to Chile (1897–1904), Minister to Belgium (1905–09), and Ambassador to Mexico (1909–13). He is best known to history for his involvement in the February 1913 coup d'état which deposed and assassinated President of Mexico Francisco I. Madero, for which he remains controversial and "perhaps the most vilified United States official of [the 20th] century" in Mexico.

Wilson was appointed by President William Howard Taft to the post of United States Ambassador to Mexico in 1910. He brought together opponents of Mexico's democratically elected President Francisco I. Madero in the Pact of the Embassy, colluding with them to stage a coup d'état in February 1913. Soon after President Woodrow Wilson took office in March 1913, he was appalled to learn that the American ambassador was involved in the plot in which the president and vice president of Mexico were murdered. President Wilson recalled him from his post as ambassador.

== Biography ==
Wilson was born in Crawfordsville, Indiana, to Congressman James Wilson and his wife, Emma Ingersoll. In 1866, his father was appointed to the position of Minister Resident to Venezuela by President Andrew Johnson and served in that role until his death in Caracas, Venezuela, on August 8, 1867. Henry Lane Wilson was a law graduate of Wabash College and practiced law and published a newspaper (the Lafayette Journal) in Lafayette, Indiana. He married Alice Vajen in 1885, and moved to Spokane, Washington, where he was in business until he was wiped out financially in the Panic of 1893.

== Diplomatic service ==
Wilson served in the U.S. Foreign Service during the presidencies of William McKinley (1897–1901), Theodore Roosevelt (1901–1909), and William Howard Taft (1909–1913), and briefly under Woodrow Wilson. He was appointed Minister to Chile in 1897, remaining in that capacity until 1904, when he was made Minister to Belgium, serving in Brussels during the height of the Congo Free State controversy.

Wilson was appointed Ambassador to Mexico by President Taft on December 21, 1909. At the time it was the only diplomatic post with the rank of ambassador. He presented his credentials to President Porfirio Díaz on March 5, 1910. Wilson arrived in Mexico following the fraudulent elections that kept Díaz in office; he had been continuously elected since 1884. A liberal general who came to power initially by coup in 1876, Díaz had opened Mexico to foreign investment and development of infrastructure, with U.S. business interests investing capital in the petroleum industry, mining, ranching and agriculture. From the U.S. government and business perspective, the stability of Díaz's authoritarian government brought stability and material progress to Mexico while generating huge profits to foreign interests. Diaz, now 80 years old, said in an interview with American reporter James Creelman that he would not run for reelection, which spurred much political excitement, but later changed his mind and won in the fraudulent 1910 election with nearly 99% of the vote over Francisco I. Madero, the scion of a rich, landowning family in northern Mexico. However, Madero brought together a broad coalition of Mexicans opposed to Díaz. Rebels in northern Mexico and in the state of Morelos put pressure on Díaz, who then resigned. An interim government was established, and Madero was elected president in November 1911. From the start, Ambassador Wilson was critical of President Madero and worked to promote U.S. interests, ultimately involving, or even spearheading, the coup that ousted Madero in February 1913.

== Coup against Madero ==
When Díaz was forced to resign in 1911, his Mexican political supporters and the foreign powers and businesses that had benefited from his policies regarding investments saw that the new president was unable to effectively lead. Wilson was "a natural ally of reactionary elements including U.S. and Mexican business interests, the Catholic Church, and eventually high-ranking members of the federal army". Wilson was a master manipulator of information and disinformation, which helped amplify the Mexican public's and foreign powers' perceptions that Madero was a naïve bungler, opposed to the interests of the U.S. He had direct contacts with the Associated Press, which conveyed news about Mexico to the U.S. and the English-language Mexico City Herald, whose American readership became increasingly unsettled by their coverage of the Madero government.

The coup d'état of General Victoriano Huerta, Felix Díaz, and General Bernardo Reyes against Madero was launched in February 1913, now known as the Ten Tragic Days. Mexico City was the site of armed violence between those supporting Madero and the rebels. The violence was the culmination of the psychological campaign that prepared those disposed to believe Madero an incapable leader to welcome his forced resignation. Although the Pact of the Embassy was to have a power-sharing arrangement between the leaders of the Mexican coup and the U.S., Huerta seized power once events were underway. The murders of Madero and his vice president were not explicitly part of the Pact of the Embassy. There was enough plausible deniability for Wilson and the Department of State to escape sanctions, but in Mexico, they are considered culpable for their deaths. Wilson was purported to even have assisted in arranging the murder of Madero's brother, Gustavo A. Madero, all of which was later disputed by Wilson.

In a 1916 interview with American journalist Robert Hammond Murray, Madero's widow, Sara Pérez Romero de Madero, described an audience she had with the U.S. ambassador during her husband's captivity. Wilson refused to use his influence to save the president's life, telling her, "I will be honest with you, Madam. Your husband's fall is because he never agreed to consult me. You know your husband had very peculiar ideas." According to Pérez, Wilson claimed that unlike Madero, Huerta did consult him as to what to do with the president and vice president, to which he answered to "do what is best for the interests of the nation".

After the inauguration of President Woodrow Wilson on March 4, 1913, he was informed of events in Mexico by a special agent, William Bayard Hale. The new president was appalled by Henry Lane Wilson's role in the coup against Madero. Hale reported that "Madero would never have been assassinated had the American Ambassador made it thoroughly understood that the plot must stop short of murder", and accused Henry Lane Wilson of "treason, perfidy and assassination in an assault on constitutional government". The President sought information independent of that provided by Henry Lane Wilson by sending John Lind, the former governor of Minnesota, to Mexico as his personal envoy. On July 17, 1913, the president dismissed Ambassador Wilson. The ambassador advocated for the diplomatic recognition of General Huerta's government, which the new U.S. president refused to do, providing an opening for forces opposed to Huerta's government to rise in armed rebellion.

In his memoirs published in 1927, the former ambassador criticized Madero's character and intelligence, without making mention of his own role in the Pact of the Embassy and the coup against the Mexican president:

Madero was a person of unsound intellect, of imperfect education and vision. He was a disciple in the least the deep of the French school in politics and economics, but never gathered for the uses of practical application its threads of philosophy or comprehended the deep common sense which lies at the root of all French political opinion. He came into power as an apostle of liberty but he was simply a man of disoriented intellect who happened to be in the public eye at the psychological moment. the responsibilities of office and the disappointments growing out of rivalries and intrigues shattered his reason completely, and in the last days of his government, during the bombardment of the capital, his mental qualities always abnormal, developed into a homicidal, dangerous form of lunacy....

== Post-government activities ==
During World War I, Wilson served on the Commission for Relief in Belgium and, in 1915, accepted the chairmanship of the Indiana State Chapter of the League to Enforce Peace, a position he held until his resignation over U.S. involvement in the League of Nations after the close of the war. Wilson was a member of Sons of the American Revolution, Society of Colonial Wars, and the Loyal Legion. He published his memoir in 1927 and died in Indianapolis in 1932. He is buried in Crown Hill Cemetery, Indianapolis.

== Works ==
- Diplomatic Episodes in Mexico, Belgium and Chile (1927)

Diplomatic posts
Preceded by Edward Henry Strobel	Ambassador to Chile; 1897–1904	Succeeded by John Hicks
Preceded by Lawrence Townsend	Ambassador to Belgium; 1905–1909	Succeeded by Charles Page Bryan
Preceded by David Eugene Thompson	Ambassador to Mexico; 1909–1913	Succeeded by Henry P. Fletcher
