= Battle of Paye =

Part of the Philippine–American War (July 31, 1900)

- Part of the Philippine–American War
Date	July 31, 1900
Location	Sitio Paye, Brgy. Balimbing, Boac, Marinduque
Result	Filipino victory

Belligerents
First Philippine Republic	United States

Commanders and leaders
Teofilo N. Roque	William S. Wells

Strength
Unknown	Unknown

Casualties and losses
Unknown	2 wounded 2 captured

The Battle of Paye took place during the Philippine–American War between the United States and the Philippines. It was fought on July 31, 1900, at Sitio Paye near Barangay Balimbing in the town of Boac, Marinduque. The short skirmish happened between the reconnaissance forces of Company A, 29th USV under the command of 1st Lieutenant Willam S. Wells and the guerrilla forces of the 2nd Guerilla under the command of Captain Teofilo Navaroso Roque.
