= List of ambassadors of the United States to Mexico =

Ambassador of the United States to Mexico
- Embajador de Estados Unidos en México
- Seal of the United States Department of State

- Flag of the United States ambassador

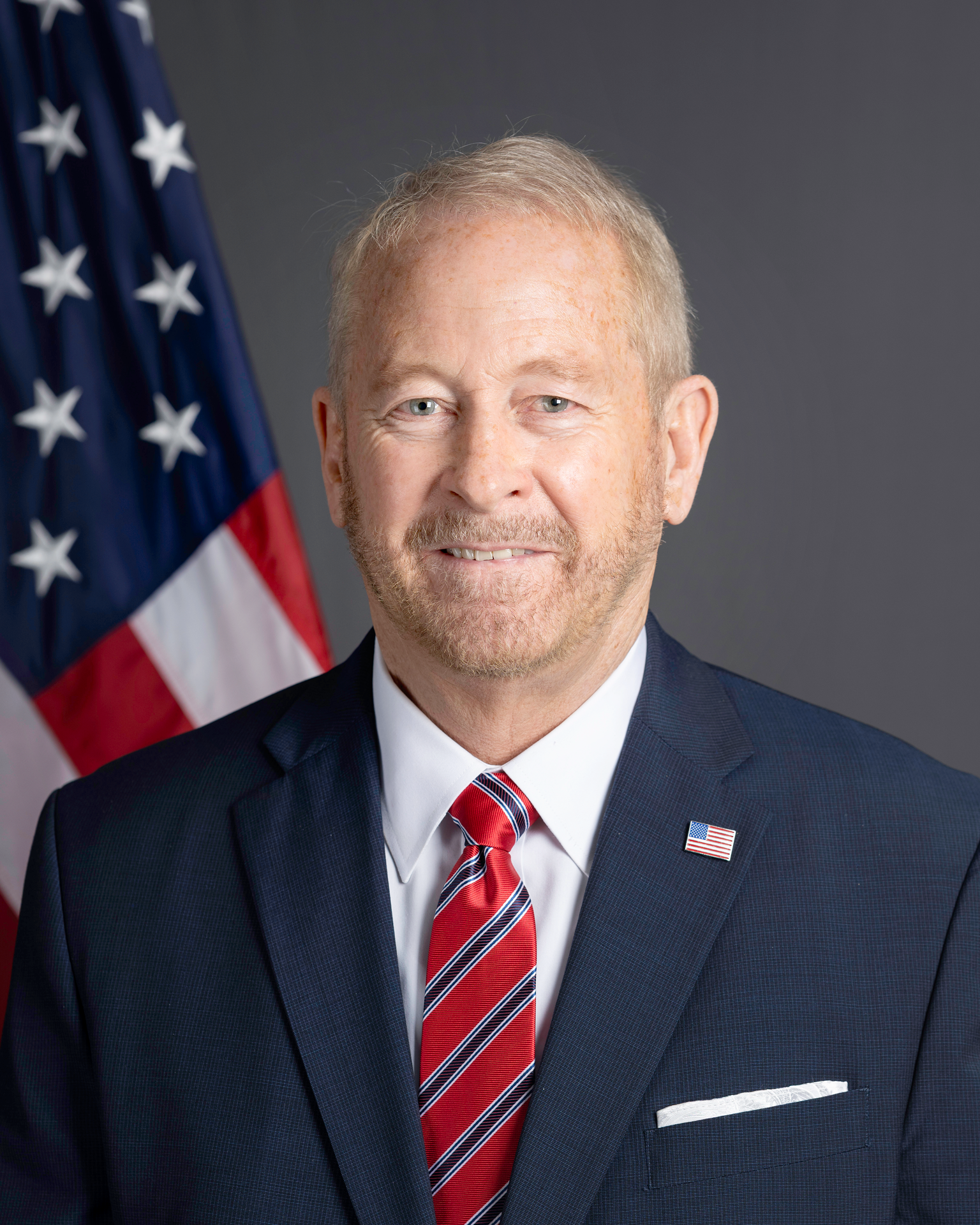
- Incumbent; Ronald D. Johnson since May 19, 2025
- U.S. Department of State
- Style: Mr. or Madam Ambassador
- Reports to: United States Secretary of State
- Seat: Embassy of the United States, Mexico City, Mexico
- Appointer: President of the United States with the advice and consent of the Senate
- Term length: At the pleasure of the president
- Inaugural holder: Joel Roberts Poinsett (as Minister)
- Formation: June 1, 1825
- Website: mx.usembassy.gov

The United States has maintained diplomatic relations with Mexico since 1823, when Andrew Jackson was appointed Envoy Extraordinary and Minister Plenipotentiary to that country. Jackson declined the appointment, however, and Joel R. Poinsett became the first U.S. envoy to Mexico in 1825. The rank of the U.S. chief of mission to Mexico was raised from Envoy Extraordinary and Minister Plenipotentiary to Ambassador Extraordinary and Plenipotentiary in 1898.

Normal diplomatic relations between the United States and Mexico have been interrupted on four occasions:

- From December 28, 1836, to July 7, 1839 (following the secession of Texas)
- From March 28, 1845, to October 2, 1848 (during the Mexican–American War)
- From June 21, 1858, to April 6, 1859 (during the War of the Reform)
- From March 18, 1913, to March 3, 1917 (during the Mexican Revolution; the U.S. embassy was closed on April 22, 1914, following the U.S. occupation of Veracruz). Ambassador Henry Lane Wilson was recalled after being implicated in a plot (La decena trágica) to overthrow President Francisco I. Madero. Rather than immediately formally appoint a new ambassador, Woodrow Wilson dispatched ex-Minnesota Governor John Lind as his personal envoy to handle Mexican diplomatic affairs.

In addition, the U.S. legation in Mexico was headed by an interim chargé d'affaires from April 1864 to August 1867, during the final years of the French Intervention.

== List of ambassadors ==
The following is a list of Ambassadors the United States has sent to Mexico, and other representatives that have served a similar function. The exact title given by the United States State Department to this position currently is "Ambassador Extraordinary and Plenipotentiary."

Mexico achieved independence from Spain in 1821; so the first three men on this list were sent by President Madison during the Mexican War of Independence (1810–1821). William Shaler participated in the 1812–13 Gutiérrez–Magee Expedition, which was a private military campaign to overthrow the Royalists and resulted in the roadside murder of two provincial governors and about a dozen other officials.

Image	Representative	Title	From	To	Appointed by
	John H. Robinson	Special Diplomatic Agent	1812	1814	James Madison
	James Wilkinson	U.S. Envoy	1816	1825	James Madison
	Joel Roberts Poinsett	Minister	1825	1829	John Quincy Adams
	Anthony Butler	Special Diplomatic Agent	1829		
	Anthony Butler	Chargé d'Affaires	1829	1835	Andrew Jackson
	William A. Slacum	Special Diplomatic Agent	1835	1836	Andrew Jackson
	Powhatan Ellis	Chargé d'Affaires	1836		Andrew Jackson
	Robert Greenhow	Special Diplomatic Agent	1837		
	Powhatan Ellis	Minister	1839	1842	Martin Van Buren
	Henry E. Lawrence	Special Diplomatic Agent	1842		John Tyler
	Waddy Thompson Jr.	Minister	1842	1844	John Tyler
	Moses Yale Beach	Special Diplomatic Agent	1843		John Tyler
	Gilbert L. Thompson	Special Diplomatic Agent	1844		John Tyler
	Wilson Shannon	Minister	1844	1845	John Tyler
	John Slidell	Minister	1845		James K. Polk
	David Conner	Special Diplomatic Agent	1846		James K. Polk
	Nathan Clifford	Minister	1848	1849	James K. Polk
	Robert P. Letcher	Minister	1849	1852	
	Robert Greenhow	Special Diplomatic Agent	1850		
	George G. Goss	Special Diplomatic Agent	1850	1852	
	George W. Slacum	Special Diplomatic Agent	1851		Millard Fillmore
	Edward Smith	Special Diplomatic Agent	1852		Millard Fillmore
	Alfred Conkling	Minister	1852	1853	Millard Fillmore
	George E. Cooper	Special Diplomatic Agent	1853		
	Christopher L. Ward	Special Diplomatic Agent	1853		
	James Gadsden	Minister	1853	1856	
	Richard S. Spofford	Special Diplomatic Agent	1854		Franklin Pierce
	John Forsyth Jr.	Minister	1856	1858	Franklin Pierce
	William M. Churchwell	Special Diplomatic Agent	1858		James Buchanan
	Alfred Mordecai	Special Diplomatic Agent	1858		James Buchanan
	Duff Green	Special Diplomatic Agent	1859		James Buchanan
	David R. Porter	Special Diplomatic Agent	1859		James Buchanan
	Robert Milligan McLane	Minister	1859	1860	James Buchanan
	Henry Roy de la Reintrie	Special Diplomatic Agent	1860		James Buchanan
	John B. Weller	Minister	1860	1861	James Buchanan
	Thomas Corwin	Minister	1861	1864	
	Robert W. Shufelt	Special Diplomatic Agent	1862		Abraham Lincoln
	Lewis D. Campbell	Minister	1866	1867	Andrew Johnson
	Marcus Otterbourg	Minister	1867		Andrew Johnson
	William S. Rosecrans	Minister	1868	1869	Andrew Johnson
	Thomas H. Nelson	Minister	1869	1873	
	John W. Foster	Minister	1873	1880	Ulysses S. Grant
	Philip Hicky Morgan	Minister	1880	1885	Rutherford B. Hayes
	Henry R. Jackson	Minister	1885	1886	
	Thomas Courtland Manning	Minister	1886	1887	Grover Cleveland
	Edward S. Bragg	Minister	1888	1889	Grover Cleveland
	Thomas Ryan	Minister	1889	1893	
	Isaac P. Gray	Minister	1893	1895	
	Matt Whitaker Ransom	Minister	1895	1897	Grover Cleveland
	Powell Clayton	Minister	1897	1898	

Image	Ambassador	Presentation	Termination	Appointed by
	Powell Clayton	January 3, 1899	May 26, 1905	William McKinley
	Edwin H. Conger	June 15, 1905	August 3, 1905	Theodore Roosevelt
	David E. Thompson	March 8, 1906	December 1, 1909	Theodore Roosevelt
	Henry Lane Wilson	March 5, 1910	July 17, 1913	William Howard Taft
	Henry P. Fletcher	March 3, 1917	January 25, 1919	Woodrow Wilson
	Charles B. Warren	March 31, 1924	July 22, 1924	Calvin Coolidge
	James R. Sheffield	October 15, 1924	June 5, 1927	Calvin Coolidge
	Dwight Morrow	October 29, 1927	September 17, 1930	Calvin Coolidge
	J. Reuben Clark	November 28, 1930	February 14, 1933	Herbert Hoover
	Josephus Daniels	April 24, 1933	November 9, 1941	Franklin D. Roosevelt
	George S. Messersmith	February 24, 1942	May 15, 1946	Franklin D. Roosevelt
	Walter C. Thurston	June 17, 1946	November 4, 1950	Harry S. Truman
	William O'Dwyer	November 23, 1950	December 6, 1952	Harry S. Truman
	Francis White	April 28, 1953	June 30, 1957	Dwight D. Eisenhower
	Robert C. Hill	July 25, 1957	December 1, 1960	Dwight D. Eisenhower
	Thomas C. Mann	May 8, 1961	December 22, 1963	John F. Kennedy
	Fulton Freeman	April 6, 1964	January 6, 1969	Lyndon B. Johnson
	Robert H. McBride	July 22, 1969	January 25, 1974	Richard Nixon
	Joseph J. Jova	January 30, 1974	February 21, 1977	Richard Nixon
	Patrick Lucey	July 19, 1977	October 31, 1979	Jimmy Carter
	Julian Nava	May 7, 1980	April 3, 1981	Jimmy Carter
	John Gavin	June 5, 1981	June 10, 1986	Ronald Reagan
	Charles J. Pilliod Jr.	November 4, 1986	April 7, 1989	Ronald Reagan
	John Negroponte	July 3, 1989	September 5, 1993	George H. W. Bush
	James R. Jones	September 10, 1993	June 25, 1997	Bill Clinton
	Jeffrey Davidow	August 5, 1998	September 14, 2002	Bill Clinton
	Tony Garza	November 22, 2002	January 20, 2009	George W. Bush
	Carlos Pascual	August 9, 2009	March 19, 2011	Barack Obama
	Earl Anthony Wayne	September 6, 2011	July 31, 2015	Barack Obama
	Roberta S. Jacobson	June 20, 2016	May 5, 2018	Barack Obama
	Christopher Landau	August 26, 2019	January 20, 2021	Donald Trump
	Ken Salazar	September 14, 2021	January 7, 2025	Joe Biden
	Ronald D. Johnson	May 19, 2025	Incumbent	Donald Trump

== See also ==
- Ambassador of Mexico to the United States
- Ambassadors of the United States
- Embassy of the United States, Mexico City
- Foreign relations of Mexico
- Mexico–United States relations
