= List of proxy wars =

A proxy war is an armed conflict in which one or more parties are supported by external powers that seek to advance their interests without directly becoming a principal combatant.

== Pre-World War I proxy wars ==
War	Dates	Combatant 1	Combatant 2	Result
Sicilian Expedition	415–413 BC	Delian League (led by Athens); Segesta; Etruscans	Peloponnesian League (led by Sparta); Corinth; Syracuse	Spartan-Syracusan victory
Egyptian–Ottoman War	1839–1841	(Ottoman Egypt) Egypt; Allies: France; Spain	(Ottoman Empire) Ottoman Empire; Allies: (United Kingdom of Great Britain and Ireland) United Kingdom (Austrian Empire) Austria (Russian Empire) Russia (Kingdom of Prussia) Prussia	Ottoman victory: Egyptian retrocession of Syria, Crete, and the Hejaz to the Ottoman Empire
Uruguayan Civil War	1839–1851	Colorados; Gobierno de la Defensa (since 1843); Unitarians; Empire of Brazil (since 1851); Entre Ríos (from 1851); Corrientes (from 1851); France; United Kingdom; Riograndense Republic (1839–1845); Italian Redshirts	Blancos; Gobierno del Cerrito (since 1843); Federalists; Lavallejistas; Argentine Confederation; Entre Ríos (until 1851)	Colorado victory
First Samoan Civil War	1886–1894	1887–1889; Supporters of Tupua Tamasese; German Empire; 1893–1894; Supporters of M. Laupepa; Supported by: German Empire; British Empire; United States	1887–1889; Supporters of Mata'afa; Supported by: United States; 1893–1894; Supporters of Mata'afa (1893); Supporters of Tamasese Lealofi (1894)	Stalemate: Malietoa Laupepa restored to power in 1889; Berlin General Act creates new government structure; Challenges to Laupepa's authority in 1893–1894 defeated
Second Samoan Civil War	1898–1899	Mataafans; Supported by: Germany	Allies: Samoa United States; United Kingdom	Compromise; Tripartite Convention; Partitioning of the Samoan archipelago; United States acquires American Samoa; Germany acquires German Samoa; Britain withdraws claim in exchange for concessions in the Solomon Islands; Mata'afa Iosefo becomes paramount chief of Samoa
Venezuelan crisis of 1902–1903	1902–1903	United Kingdom; France; Germany; Italy; Supported by: Spain; Mexico; Belgium; Netherlands; Denmark	Venezuela; Supported by: United States; Argentina	Compromise: Venezuelan debt dispute resolved; European fleet withdraws
Dervish War	1896–1922	Dervish movement; Supported by: Ottoman Empire; Ethiopia (1915–1916); German Empire	British Empire; Italy; Ethiopian Empire (1900–1904 and 1914–1915)	Dervish movement defeat
Mexican Revolution	1910–1920	(Mexico) Pro-government: 1910–1911: Porfiriato; Federales; Porfiristas; 1911–1913: Maderistas; Federales; 1913–1914: Huertistas; Federales; 1914–1915: Conventionists; Villistas; Zapatistas; 1915–1920: Carrancistas; Supported by: United States (1910–1913); Germany (c. 1913–1918)	(Mexico) Anti-government: 1910–1911: Maderistas; Orozquistas; Magonistas; Zapatistas; 1911–1913: Reyistas; Felicistas; Orozquistas; Magonistas; Zapatistas; 1913–1914: Constitutionalists; Carrancistas; Villistas; Zapatistas; 1914–1915: Carrancistas; 1915–1920; Villistas; Zapatistas; Felicistas; Forces led by Aureliano Blanquet; Forces led by Álvaro Obregón; Supported by: United States (1913–1918); United Kingdom (1916–1918)	Revolutionary victory Full results: Porfirio Díaz ousted from power and exiled to France, May 1911.; Francisco I. Madero elected president of Mexico, 1911, assassinated February 1913.; Victoriano Huerta overthrows Madero and assumes the presidency 1913–1914.; Venustiano Carranza creates an alliance of northerners under the Constitutionalist banner 1913.; Convention of Aguascalientes between revolutionary leaders, 1914.; Carranza's Constitutionalist Army under General Álvaro Obregón defeats Pancho Villa at the Battle of Celaya, 1915.; Carranza consolidates his position as president of Mexico, 1915.; Mexican Constitution of 1917 enacted.; Rebellion against Carranza government by Sonoran generals Obregón, Plutarco Elías Calles, and Adolfo de la Huerta in the Plan of Agua Prieta, 1920.; Interim Presidency of De la Huerta, 1920. Pancho Villa amnestied.; Successive assassinations of revolutionary leaders Madero (1913), Zapata (1919), Venustiano Carranza (1920), Pancho Villa (1923), Álvaro Obregón (1928).; Laborist Party victories in the 1920 and 1924 elections.; Eventual formation of the National Revolutionary Party (1929) and consolidation of the post-revolutionary regime.
Mexican Border War	1910–1919	Mexico; Villistas; Constitutionalistas; Carrancistas; Maderistas; Seditionistas; Supported by: Germany	United States	Status quo ante bellum: Seditionist insurgency suppressed; Permanent border wall established along the border of Nogales, Sonora, and Arizona, after the American victory in the Battle of Ambos Nogales; American troops fail to capture Pancho Villa and withdraw from Chihuahua

== Inter-war period proxy wars ==
War	Dates	Combatant 1	Combatant 2	Result
Finnish Civil War	1918	Finnish Whites; German Empire; Foreign volunteers: Swedish Brigade; Estonian volunteers; (Second Polish Republic) Polish Legion; (Russian Empire) White Army	Finnish Reds; (Russian Socialist Federative Soviet Republic) Soviet Russia	Finnish Whites victory: Establishment of the Kingdom of Finland; German hegemony until November 1918; Division in Finnish society; Collapse of the Finnish Reds; Dissolution of the Finnish Socialist Workers' Republic
Revolutions and interventions in Hungary	1918–1920	Czechoslovakia (Kingdom of Romania) Romania; State of Slovenes, Croats and Serbs; Kingdom of Serbs, Croats and Slovenes; Republic of Prekmurje; Hutsul Republic Kingdom of Hungary France	Hungarian Republic (Hungarian Soviet Republic) Hungarian SR; Slovak SR	Little Entente victory: Collapse of the Hungarian Soviet Republic; Romanian occupation of most of Hungary; Treaty of Trianon; Miklós Horthy takes power as Regent of Hungary
Turkish War of Independence	1919–1923	Allied powers: Greece France (until 1921): French West Africa; Armenian Legion; Algeria; Morocco; Tunisia; United Kingdom: India; Armenia (in 1920) Istanbul Government^{[e]} (in 1920): Other pro-Istanbul rebels; Georgia (in 1921) Separatists: Pontic Greek rebels; Kurdish rebels; Assyrian rebels; Green Army (1920–1921)	Turkish Nationalists: Ankara Government (1919–1920; 1920–1923) Also: Azerbaijan (1918–1920); Aras Republic (1918–1919); Iğdır National Republic (1918–1920); Provisional Kars Government (1918–1919); Green Army (1919–1920); Oltu Council Government (1919–1920); Kurdistan (1919; 1921–1923)	Turkish victory: Establishment of the Republic of Turkey
Chinese Civil War	1927–1936, 1945–1949	(Republic of China (1912–1949)) Republic of China; Kuomintang; Republic of China Armed Forces	1927–1936; Chinese Soviet Republic (from 1931); Jiangxi Soviet (1931–1934); Chinese Communist Party; Chinese Red Army; 1945–1949; Yan'an Soviet; People's Republic of China (1949); Chinese Communist Party; People's Liberation Army	Communist victory: Communist control of mainland China; Proclamation of the People's Republic of China; Retreat of the government of the Republic of China to Taiwan
Chaco War	1932–1935	Bolivia	Paraguay	Paraguayan victory: Most of the disputed area awarded to Paraguay
Spanish Civil War	1936–1939	Nationalists; FET y de las JONS (Note: The only party under Francisco Franco from 1937 onward, a merger of the other factions on the Nationalist side.); FE de las JONS (Note: 1936–1937, then merged into FET y de las JONS); Requetés/CT; CEDA; Spanish Renovation; Army of Africa; Viriatos; Foreign volunteers; Italy; Germany	Republicans; People's Army; Popular Front; UGT; CNT-FAI; POUM (Note: The POUM fought in the Spanish Civil War from 17 July 1936 until 16 June 1937, when the POUM was illegalized and suppressed by the Popular Front Republican government led by Prime Minister Juan Negrín, with the government suppression of the POUM supported by Joseph Stalin, the Comintern and the PCE.); Generalitat de Catalunya; Euzko Gudarostea (Note: The Euzko Gudarostea fought in the Spanish Civil War from 17 July 1936 until it surrendered to the Italian Corpo Truppe Volontarie in the Santoña Agreement on 24 August 1937.); International Brigades; Foreign volunteers; Soviet Union	Nationalist victory; End of the Second Spanish Republic; Establishment of the Spanish State under the rule of Francisco Franco; Post-war Francoist mass killings and repression; Spanish Maquis continue irregular warfare sporadically until 1965

== Cold War proxy wars ==
War	Dates	Combatant 1	Combatant 2	Result
Chinese Civil War	1945–1949	Yan'an Soviet; People's Republic of China (1949); Chinese Communist Party; People's Liberation Army	(Republic of China (1912–1949)) Republic of China; Kuomintang; Republic of China Armed Forces; United States	Communist victory: Communist control of mainland China; Proclamation of the People's Republic of China; Retreat of the government of the Republic of China to Taiwan
Iran crisis of 1946	1945–1946	Azerbaijan People's Government; Republic of Mahabad; Tudeh Military Network; Supported by: Soviet Union	Iran; Supported by: United Kingdom; United States	Iranian victory: Dissolution of the Azerbaijan People's Government and the Republic of Mahabad
Greek Civil War	1946–1949	Provisional Democratic Government (from 1947); Democratic Army (from December 1946); Communist Party of Greece and allies; Ex-EAM members and other communist guerrillas' local groups (March–December 1946); People's Civil Guard; Supported by: Yugoslavia (1946–1948); Bulgaria; Albania; Soviet Union (limited)	Kingdom of Greece; Hellenic Army; Royal Hellenic Air Force (minor participation); Royal Hellenic Navy (limited participation in support); Royal Gendarmerie; MAY (1946–1948); TEA (1948–1949); Supported by: United Kingdom (1944–1947); United States (1946–1949)	Kingdom of Greece victory
First Indochina War	1946–1954	Democratic Republic of Vietnam; (North Vietnam) Việt Minh	French Union; France; French Indochina; State of Vietnam; Kingdom of Cambodia; Kingdom of Laos; United States (1953–54); CIA	DR Vietnamese victory: Division of Vietnam between North Vietnam and South Vietnam in 1954; Independence of Vietnam, Laos and Cambodia
Paraguayan Civil War	1947	Liberal Party; Febrerista Revolutionary Concentration; Paraguayan Communist Party	(Paraguay) Paraguayan Government; Military of Paraguay; Colorado militias; Supported by: Argentina; United States	Government/Military and Colorado Party victory: All other political parties outlawed; Paraguay becomes a one-party state
Malayan Emergency	1948–1960	Communist forces: Malayan Communist Party; Malayan National Liberation Army	British Commonwealth forces: United Kingdom; Federation of Malaya; Singapore; Malacca (until 1957); Penang (until 1957); Kenya; Southern Rhodesia (until 1953); Rhodesia and Nyasaland (from 1953); Fiji; Australia; New Zealand; Supported by: Thailand (Thai–Malaysian border)	Commonwealth victory: Independence of Malaya from the United Kingdom on 31 August 1957; Malaya became an independent member of the British Commonwealth; CPM retreats to the Malayan-Thai border; Insurgency continues (1968–1989); Conflict resolved through the Peace Agreement of Hat Yai (1989)
Korean War	1950–1953	North Korea; China; Soviet Union (air support only)	South Korea; United Nations (Note: On 9 July 1951 troop constituents were: US: 70.4%; ROK: 23.3%; other UNC: 6.3%.); United States; ... see other countries	Inconclusive: Korean Demilitarized Zone established; North Korea gains the city of Kaesong, but loses a net total of 3,900 km^{2} (1,506 sq mi), including the city of Sokcho, to South Korea
Mau Mau Uprising	1952–1960	Mau Mau rebels (Note: The name Kenya Land and Freedom Army is sometimes heard in connection with Mau Mau. KLFA was the name that Dedan Kimathi used for a coordinating body which he tried to set up for Mau Mau. It was also the name of another militant group that sprang up briefly in the spring of 1960; the group was broken up during a brief operation from 26 March to 30 April.); Kenya Land and Freedom Army; Maasai Bands (from 1954)	United Kingdom; Kenya; Uganda; Southern Rhodesia	British victory
Second Indochina War (Vietnam War)	1955–1975	North Vietnam; Viet Cong and PRG; Pathet Lao; Khmer Rouge; GRUNK (from 1970); China (1965–1969); Soviet Union; North Korea	South Vietnam; United States; South Korea; Australia; New Zealand; Laos; Cambodia (1967–1970); Khmer Republic (1970–1975); Thailand; Philippines; Taiwan; Spain	North Vietnamese victory: Reunification of North Vietnam and South Vietnam into the Socialist Republic of Vietnam in 1976
First Taiwan Strait Crisis	1954–1955	People's Republic of China	Republic of China; United States	Ceasefire; major escalation avoided: The PRC takes control of the Yijiangshan and Dachen Islands; The ROC and US navies evacuate military personnel and civilians from the Dachen Islands; Formosa Resolution of 1955 and Sino-American Mutual Defense Treaty between the ROC and US
First Sudanese Civil War	1955–1972	(United Kingdom) (Egypt) Anglo-Egyptian Sudan (1955–1956); Republic of Sudan (1956–1969); Democratic Republic of Sudan (1969–1972); Combat support: Uganda (joint operations on Ugandan territory, 1965–1969); (Libya) Libyan Arab Republic (from 1969; combat involvement from 1970); Non-combat support: United Arab Republic; Soviet Union; United Kingdom; China; Yugoslavia; East Germany; Czechoslovakia; Saudi Arabia; Kingdom of Libya (until 1969); Algeria; United States; West Germany	SDF mutineers, bandits, and unaffiliated separatist militias; ALF (1965–1970); Anyanya (from 1963); Israel (from 1969); Supported by: Ethiopia; Uganda (from about 1970); (Democratic Republic of the Congo) Congo-Léopoldville; Kenya; France	Stalemate
Suez Crisis	1956	Egypt	Israel; United Kingdom; France	Israeli occupation of the Sinai Peninsula and the Gaza Strip until March 1957
Second Taiwan Strait Crisis	1958	People's Republic of China	Republic of China; United States	Status quo ante bellum: Successful military defence of Kinmen by the ROC
1958 Lebanon crisis	1958	(Lebanon) Lebanese Opposition: INM; LCP; PSP; Supported by: United Arab Republic	Government; Lebanese Armed Forces; Kataeb Party; Syrian Social Nationalist Party; ARF; Supported by: United States	Inconclusive: Reconciliation Government formed
1959 Tibetan uprising	1959	People's Republic of China; People's Liberation Army	Tibetan and Khampa protesters and guerrillas; Tibetan Army remnants; Simultaneous rebellion in Kham and Amdo: Chushi Gangdruk; Supported by: Republic of China; United States (CIA); India (diplomatic)	Uprising suppressed: Abolition of the Kashag; Tibetan diaspora; Flight of the 14th Dalai Lama to India
Central American crisis	1960–1996	EGP; FAR; ORPA; PGT; URNG; FSLN; EPS; FMLN (CRM); Nicaragua (1979–90); Supported by; Soviet Union; Cuba; Mexico; Libya; Romania (before 1989); Zapatistas; Sweden; Costa Rica; Bulgaria; China	Guatemala; ESA; White Hand; and other paramilitary groups; (Nicaragua) Somoza government; National Guard; Contras (1981–90); (El Salvador) Salvadoran military government; Supported by; United States; Saudi Arabia; Honduras; Chile; Argentina; Panama; Israel; Taiwan	
Congo Crisis	1960–1965	1960–1963: (Democratic Republic of the Congo) Republic of the Congo; Supported by: Soviet Union (1960); (United Nations) ONUC (Note: ONUC, the United Nations Operation in the Congo, included troops from Ghana, Tunisia, Morocco, Ethiopia, Ireland, Guinea, Sweden, Mali, Sudan, Liberia, Canada, India, Indonesia and the United Arab Republic among others.); 1963–1965: Democratic Republic of the Congo; United States; Belgium; Supported by: (United Nations) ONUC (1964)	1960–1963: Katanga; South Kasai; Supported by: Belgium (Note: The secession of Katanga and South Kasai was also supported by South Africa, France, Portuguese Angola and the neighbouring Central African Federation. However, neither was ever officially recognised by any state.); 1960–1962: (Democratic Republic of the Congo) Free Republic of the Congo; Supported by: Soviet Union; 1963–1965: Kwilu and Simba rebels; Supported by: Soviet Union; China; Cuba	The Congo established as an independent unitary state under the authoritarian presidency of Mobutu Sese Seko.
Portuguese Colonial War	1961–1974	Portugal; UNITA (after 1972); Material support: Rhodesia; Israel; South Africa; Francoist Spain; United States (after 1972)	Angola: MPLA; UNITA (until 1972); FNLA; FLEC; Guinea: PAIGC; FLING; Mozambique: (Mozambique) FRELIMO; Material support: Soviet Union; China; Cuba; East Germany; Zaire; Brazil	Carnation Revolution; Military stalemate; Rebel political victory; Alvor Agreement; Lusaka Accord; Portuguese overseas territories in Africa become independent
First Iraqi–Kurdish War	1961–1970	Before 1968: Iraq; Syria (1963); Supported by: United States (from 1963); Egypt (1965) After 1968: Ba'athist Iraq	KDP; Supported by: Iran; Israel; United States (alleged)	Military stalemate: Iraqi–Kurdish Autonomy Agreement; Arabization program continued; Second Iraqi–Kurdish War in 1974
Eritrean War of Independence	1961–1991	ELF (1961–1981) Supported by: Sudan; Libya; China (until 1972); Cuba (until 1975); Syria; Iraq; Saudi Arabia; Somalia; EPLF (since 1973) (Tigray Region) TPLF (since 1975) Supported by: Libya; Sudan; Somalia; Syria; Iraq; Kuwait; United Arab Emirates	1961–1974; Ethiopian Empire Supported by: United States; Israel; 1974–1991; Derg (1974–1987); PDR Ethiopia (1987–1991) Supported by: Soviet Union (1974–1990); Cuba (1974–1990); South Yemen (1974–1990); Israel; North Korea	EPLF victory: Eritrean insurgency begins in 1961; ELF defeated by EPLF and TPLF during the Eritrean Civil Wars; Fall of the Derg regime; Eritrea gains de facto independence from Ethiopia in 1991 under EPLF rule, and de jure independence after the referendum held in 1993 under UN auspices; Independence of Eritrea; Ethiopia becomes a landlocked country.
North Yemen Civil War	1962–1970	Yemen Arab Republic; Egypt	Kingdom of Yemen; Saudi Arabia	Republican victory
Dhofar Rebellion	1963–1976	DLF (1963–1968); PFLOAG (1968–1974); NDFLOAG (1969–1971); PFLO (1974–1976); Support: South Yemen; Soviet Union; China; Cuba; North Korea; Iraq	(Muscat and Oman) Oman; Iran; United Kingdom; Jordan; Support: United Arab Emirates (financial aid); Saudi Arabia (financial aid)	Omani government victory
Sarawak Communist Insurgency	1962–1990	Communist forces: North Kalimantan Communist Party; Sarawak People's Guerrilla Force; North Kalimantan People's Army; Indonesia (1962–65) (military aid); Other support: Brunei People's Party; North Kalimantan National Army; Malayan Communist Party; Malayan National Liberation Army; Supported by: China; North Vietnam (until 1975); North Korea	Anti-communist forces: United Kingdom; Sarawak (until 1963); Malaysia; Sarawak (after 1963); Supported by: Australia; Brunei; New Zealand; United States; Indonesia (after 1965) (Indo-Malay border)	Peace Declaration of Sri Aman in 1973; Dissolution of the Sarawak Communist Organisation/North Kalimantan Communist Party (SCO/NKCP).
Aden Emergency	1963–1967	FLOSY; Supported by: United Arab Republic	United Kingdom; Federation of South Arabia; Protectorate of South Arabia; (Yemen) NLF	Yemeni NLF victory: British withdrawal; Independence of South Yemen
Rhodesian Bush War	1964–1979	ZANU (ZANLA); ZAPU (ZIPRA); (People's Republic of Mozambique) Mozambique; ANC (MK); Zambia	Rhodesia (1964–1979); Zimbabwe Rhodesia (1979); Portugal (1964–1974) (Note: Portuguese forces assisted the Rhodesians in cross-border operations into Portuguese Mozambique. See Operation Flotilla and Operation Birch.); South Africa (from 1967)	Lancaster House Agreement: Rhodesia disestablished; Zimbabwe gains independence in its place.
Dominican Civil War	1965	Constitutionalist faction; Dominican Revolutionary Party; Social Christian Revolutionary Party; June 14th Revolutionary Movement	Loyalist faction United States IAPF: Brazil; Paraguay; Nicaragua; Costa Rica; El Salvador; Honduras	Loyalist victory: Ceasefire declared; Formation of the provisional government for new elections; Deposition of Juan Bosch of the presidency ratified; Organization of presidential elections in 1966 under international supervision; Election of Joaquín Balaguer as the new president; Establishment of the Fourth Dominican Republic on July 1, 1966
Chadian Civil War	1965–1979	FROLINAT (from 1966); First Liberation Army (until 1975); Second Liberation Army (1968–76); Third Liberation Army (from 1968); Various splinter factions; (Chad) FLT (until 1975); (Chad) Volcan Army (from 1970); (Chad) FAP (from 1976); (Chad) FAN (1976–78, 1979); Tribal and peasant rebels; (Libyan Arab Republic) (History of Libya under Muammar Gaddafi) Libya (1969–72, from 1975); Supported by: Algeria; Kingdom of Libya (non-combat, until 1969)	Chad; Chadian Armed Forces; FROLINAT's First Liberation Army (c. 1975); FAN (1978–79); France; Supported by: Egypt; Israel	Rebel victory: Overthrow and death of François Tombalbaye in 1975; Overthrow of Félix Malloum in 1979; Signing of Lagos Accord and installation of Transitional Government of National Unity
Communist insurgency in Thailand	1965–1983	Communist Party of Thailand; Malayan Communist Party; Pathet Lao; Khmer Rouge (until 1978)	Thailand; Royal Thai Armed Forces; Royal Thai Police; Volunteer Defense Corps; Thahan Phran; Internal Security Operations Command; Village Scouts; Nawaphon; Red Gaurs; Republic of China (until August 1967); Republic of China Army 49th Division; Malaysia; United States; KPNLF; Khmer Rouge (after 1978)	Thai government victory: Amnesty declared on 23 April 1980 by the Thai government; Order 66/2523 signed by Prime Minister Prem Tinsulanonda; Communist insurgency declines and ends in 1983
Bolivian Campaign	1966–1967	ELN; Cuba	Bolivia; United States	Bolivian government victory: Che Guevara executed
Korean DMZ Conflict (1966–1969)	1966–1969	North Korea	South Korea; United States	South Korean victory: Status quo ante bellum
South African Border War	1966–1990	SWAPO (PLAN); MPLA (FAPLA); Cuba; SWANU; ANC (MK); Zambia; Military advisers and pilots: Soviet Union; East Germany	South Africa; TGNU (1985–1989); Portugal (until 1974); UNITA (from 1975); FNLA (1975)	Military stalemate: Angolan Tripartite Accord, leading to: Withdrawal of South African forces from Namibia; withdrawal of Cuban forces from Angola; 1989 Namibian parliamentary elections; SWAPO government assuming power in Namibia; South West Africa gains independence from South Africa as the Republic of Namibia
Nigerian Civil War	1967–1970	Nigeria; Egypt (Note: Close air support); Supported by: United Kingdom; Soviet Union; Ethiopia	Biafra; Supported by: China; Tanzania; Zambia; Gabon; Côte d'Ivoire; Covert support: France; Portugal; Israel; South Africa; Rhodesia	Nigerian victory: Dissolution of the Republic of Biafra
Years of Lead	1968–1988	Far-left terrorists: Red Brigades (Note: Disbanded by police.); Front Line (Note: Disbanded by members due to increasing police pressure. Most already joined the Red Brigades; others focused on politics.); October 22 Group (Note: Dismantled by police. Members merged into the Red Brigades and Partisan Action Groups.); PAC (Note: Dismantled by police.); Continuous Struggle (Note: Disbanded due to internal feuds. Some members merged into the Red Brigades whilst others formed Prima Linea.); Workers' Power (Note: Disbanded due to internal disagreements. Some members merged into the group Autonomous Worker.); Workers' Autonomy (Note: Dissolved due to police pressure and members merging into the PAC, Red Brigades, and Prima Linea. Those imprisoned often associated with NAP.); Supported by: RAF; Sigurimi (alleged); (Palestine Liberation Organization) PLO (alleged); KGB (alleged); (East Germany) Stasi (alleged); Mukhabarat el-Jamahiriya (alleged); UDBA (alleged)	(Italy) Italian government; SISMI; SISDE; Armed Forces; Carabinieri; State Police; Supported by: (NATO) Gladio; CIA; Far-right terrorists: New Order (Note: Banned, some joined Ordine Nero.); National Vanguard (Note: Banned. Its members joined Ordine Nero.); Black Order; NAR (Note: Dismantled.); Third Position (Note: Dissolved by police. Used by NAR as a cover name later on.); Supported by: Propaganda Due; SISMI (factions); CIA; Greek junta; Magliana Gang; Sicilian Mafia (alleged)	Government victory: Most militant and terrorist groups disbanded
Communist insurgency in Malaysia	1968–1989	Communist forces: Malayan Communist Party: Malayan National Liberation Army; Communist Party of Malaya/Revolutionary Faction (1970–1983); Communist Party of Malaya/Marxist–Leninist (1974–1983); Malaysian Communist Party (1983–1987); North Kalimantan Communist Party; Communist Party of Thailand (until 1983); Supported by: China (until 1976) Soviet Union; Indonesia (1962–1965)	Anti-communist forces: Malaysia; Singapore; Thailand; Supported by: United Kingdom; New Zealand; Indonesia (from 1965)	Malaysian government victory: Peace agreement reached; Communists agree to a ceasefire; Peace Agreement of Hat Yai signed between the communists and the governments of Malaysia and Thailand; Dissolution of the Malayan Communist Party (MCP); Insurgency continues in Sarawak until 1990
Operation Condor	1975–1983	Political dissidents (including socialists, anarchists and communists); Intelligence agencies of participating countries	Members: Argentina; Bolivia; Brazil; Chile; Ecuador; Paraguay; Peru; Uruguay; Intelligence agencies of participating countries; Supported: United States; France (alleged, denied); (Republic of Venezuela) Venezuela (alleged); Colombia (alleged)	Concluded after the fall of the Argentinean military junta in 1983
Al-Wadiah War	1969	South Yemen	Saudi Arabia; Supported by: Pakistan (air support)	Saudi victory: al-Wadiah and Sharurah captured by Saudi forces
Bangladesh Liberation War	1971	Pakistan	Bangladesh; India (3–16 Dec.)	Bangladeshi-Indian victory: Surrender of Pakistani forces; Independence of Bangladesh; East Pakistan secedes from Pakistan as the People's Republic of Bangladesh
Yemenite War of 1972	1972	South Yemen; Cuba	North Yemen	Status quo ante bellum
Angolan Civil War	1975–2002	People's Republic of Angola/Republic of Angola: MPLA; Cuba (1975–1989); SWAPO (1975–1989); ANC (1975–1989); Executive Outcomes (1993–1995); FLNC (1975–2001); Namibia (2001–2002) (Note: Irritated by UNITA cross-border raids, the Namibian Defence Force retaliated by sending units into southern Angola and destroying a UNITA training camp at Licua in late January 2001. The Namibian troops were not withdrawn from Angola until May 2002.) Military advisers and pilots: Soviet Union (1975–1989); East Germany (1975–1989); North Korea (1980s) (Note: The North Korean Military Mission in Angola had about 1,500 personnel attached to FAPLA in 1986, most likely advisers, although their exact duties are uncertain. Their presence in Angola may have been indirectly subsidised by the Soviet Union. Up to 3,000 North Korean military personnel served in Angola throughout the 1980s.)	Democratic People's Republic of Angola: UNITA; FNLA (1975–1976); FNLA (1976–1978); South Africa (1975–1989); Zaire (1975) FLEC	MPLA victory: Withdrawal of all foreign forces in 1989.; Transition towards a multiparty political system in 1991/92.; Dissolution of the armed forces of the FNLA.; Participation of UNITA and FNLA, as political parties, in the new political system, from 1991/92 onwards.; Jonas Savimbi, leader of UNITA, killed in 2002; UNITA abandoned armed struggle and participated in electoral politics.; Resistance of FLEC continued to this day
Ethiopian Civil War	1974–1991	Derg (1974–1987); PDR Ethiopia; Supported by: Soviet Union (1974–1990); Cuba (1974–1990); South Yemen (1974–1990); Somali anti-Barre groups: (Somalia) USC; SSDF; SPM; SNM	EPRDF: (Tigray Region) TPLF; (Amhara Region) EPDM; OPDO; EPRP; MEISON (from 1977); EDU; OLF; WSLF; ALF; Eritrean separatists: ELF (until 1981); EPLF; Somali nationalists: WSLF; ONLF Supported by: United States; Somalia (1978–1991); China (from 1978); (Socialist Republic of Romania) Romania (1978–1989)	EPLF/TPLF rebel victory: Fall of the Ethiopian Empire and subsequent implementation of military rule; Creation, then collapse, of the People's Democratic Republic of Ethiopia by the Derg; Installation of the TPLF-led transitional government which would later become the EPRDF government in Ethiopia; Installation of the EPLF-established PFDJ government in Eritrea after independence from Ethiopia; Independence of Eritrea; Ethiopia becomes a landlocked country.
Lebanese Civil War	1975–1990 (Note: The last battle took place from 2–6 July 1991 between the Lebanese government and the Palestine Liberation Organization due to the latter's refusal to accept the Taif Agreement.) (15 years and 6 months)	Lebanese National Movement (1975–1982) Jammoul (1982–1990): Al-Mourabitoun; Progressive Socialist Party (PSP); Lebanese Communist Party (LCP); Syrian Social Nationalist Party in Lebanon (SSNP); Communist Action Organization in Lebanon (OCAL); Lebanese Movement in Support of Fatah (LMSF); Arab Socialist Ba'ath Party – Lebanon Region; Revolutionary Communist Group; Sixth of February Movement; Socialist Arab Lebanon Vanguard Party (SALVP) Popular Nasserist Organization (PNO) Lebanese Arab Army (LAA) Other minor organizations; PLO (1975–1983); ASALA Hezbollah (1985–1990); Iran (from 1980, mainly IRGC and Army paramilitary units) Islamic Unification Movement (from 1982)	Lebanese Front: Kataeb Party; Lebanese Forces; Marada Brigades (until 1978) Guardians of the Cedars Al-Tanzim Lebanese Youth Movement (MKG) Tyous Team of Commandos Zahliote Group Shuraya Party Vanguard of the Maani Army (MDJ) (Other minor organizations); Army of Free Lebanon (until 1977); SLA (from 1976); Israel (from 1978) Tigers Militia (until 1980) Syria (1976, 1983–1991); Amal Movement; PNSF; Marada Brigades (left LF in 1978; aligned with Syria) Lebanese Armed Forces UNIFIL (from 1978); Multinational Force in Lebanon (1982–1984): United States; UK; France; Italy; Arab Deterrent Force (1976–1982) List: Saudi Arabia (1976–1979); Sudan (1976–1979); UAE (1976–1979); Libya (1976 only); South Yemen (1976–1977)	Taif Agreement; Christian-to-Muslim representation in Parliament of Lebanon adjusted from ratio of 55:45 to 50:50; Political powers of Muslim-reserved position of Prime Minister strengthened over Christian-reserved position of President; Disarmament of all Lebanese and non-Lebanese militias, excluding Iran-backed Hezbollah; Continued hostilities between Lebanon and the Palestine Liberation Organization (PLO), and PLO expulsion to Tunis, Tunisia in 1982.; Expulsion of Palestinian militias from Lebanon after the Battle of Sidon in 1991; Collapse of the Israel-backed State of Free Lebanon in 1984 and of Israel's South Lebanon security belt administration in 2000; Continued fighting between Israel and Hezbollah in the Shebaa Farms conflict, eventually leading to the 2006 Lebanon War; Dominance of Hezbollah armed strength across Lebanon since 1990; Syria occupies northern/eastern Lebanon until 30 April 2005; Israel occupies southern Lebanon until 25 May 2000
Indonesian occupation of East Timor	1975–2002	(Timor-Leste) Democratic Republic of East Timor (Until 1976); East Timorese Resistance Groups; Fretilin (Falintil); CNRM (Note: later CNRT); UDT (Note: from 1986)	Indonesia; Timor Timur; Pro-Indonesian East Timorese factions; UDT (Note: until 1986); APODETI; KOTA (Note: until 1998); Trabalhista (Note: until 1986)	1999 East Timorese crisis; Indonesia retains a strong influence in East Timor; East Timor gains independence after an independence referendum votes to become an independent sovereign state
Shaba I	1977	Front for the National Liberation of the Congo (FNLC); Supported by: Angola; Cuba; Soviet Union	Zaire; Morocco; Egypt; France; Belgium; Supported by: United States; Saudi Arabia; Sudan; Nigeria	Zairian victory: FNLC expelled from Shaba
Ogaden War	1977–1978	Ethiopia; Cuba; Soviet Union; South Yemen	Somalia; WSLF	Ethiopian victory: Somalia breaks all ties with the Soviet Bloc and the Second World (except China and Romania).; Beginning of the Somali Rebellion
Cambodian-Vietnamese War	1978–1989	Vietnam (People's Republic of Kampuchea) FUNSK (from 1978) Post-invasion: Until April 1989: Vietnam; People's Republic of Kampuchea; Cuba (reconstruction experts); From April 1989: State of Cambodia	Democratic Kampuchea (1977–1982); Thailand (border clashes) Post-invasion: Coalition Government of Democratic Kampuchea (1982–1990): Khmer Rouge; KPNLF; FUNCINPEC; Thailand (border clashes)	1991 Paris Peace Accords; Vietnam's overthrow of Democratic Kampuchea in early 1979; End of the Cambodian genocide; Establishment, then disestablishment, of the People's Republic of Kampuchea; Vietnamese occupation in Cambodia; Chinese invasion of Vietnam and continued border skirmishes; Start of CGDK insurgency and Thai border skirmishes; Establishment of the Coalition Government of Democratic Kampuchea in 1982; Vietnamese withdrawal from Cambodia in 1989; UN-led transition in Cambodia
Mozambican Civil War	1977–1992	Mozambique (People's Republic until 1990): FRELIMO; UNAMO (1988–1992); ZANU (until 1979); Zimbabwe (from 1980); Soviet Union; Tanzania; Malawi (from 1987)	RENAMO; PRM (merged with RENAMO in 1982); UNAMO (1987–1988); COREMO; UNIPOMO; FUMO; Rhodesia (until 1979): Ex-Flechas; South Africa (from 1978)	Stalemate
Chittagong Hill Tracts conflict	1977–1997	Bangladesh	Parbatya Chattagram Jana Samhati Samiti	Chittagong Hill Tracts Peace Accord
Shaba II	1978	FNLC	Zaire; France; Belgium; Morocco; United States	Zairian victory; mutual end of support for other nations' rebel groups
Uganda–Tanzania War	1978–1979	Tanzania; Uganda National Liberation Front: Kikosi Maalum; Front for National Salvation; Save Uganda Movement; Others; Mozambique; Supported by: Zambia; Angola; Ethiopia; Algeria	Uganda; Libya; Palestine Liberation Organization; Supported by: Pakistan; Saudi Arabia	Tanzanian victory: Collapse of the Second Republic of Uganda
NDF Rebellion	1978–1982	NDF; Supported by: South Yemen; Libya	North Yemen; Islamic Front; Supported by: Republic of China; United States	Government victory
Chadian–Libyan War	1978–1987	Libya: Islamic Legion; Pro-Libyan Chadian factions: FROLINAT; GUNT (1979–1986); Codos (1983–1986); FAP (1978–1986); Pro-Libyan Palestinian and Lebanese groups: PLO (1987); Abu Nidal Organization; Supported by: Algeria; East Germany; Soviet Union	Anti-Libyan Chadian factions: FAT (1978–1979); FAN (1978–1983); FANT (1983–1987); GUNT (1986–1987); France; Inter-African Force: Zaire; Nigeria; Senegal; NFSL Supported by: DR Sudan (1978–1985); Sudan (1985–1987); Egypt (1977–1981); Israel; Iraq; Algeria (pre-reapproachment); United States	Chadian and French victory: Chad regains control of the Aouzou Strip.
Yemenite War of 1979	1979	South Yemen	North Yemen	South Yemeni victory
Soviet–Afghan War	1979–1989	Soviet Union; Afghanistan	Afghan mujahideen	Afghan mujahideen victory
Sino-Vietnamese War	1979	Vietnam Supported by: Soviet Union; Laos	China	Status quo ante bellum or ceasefire
Ethiopian–Somali Border War	1982–1983	Ethiopia; SSDF	Somalia	Stalemate: Ethiopian invasion repulsed; Stalemate at border towns of Galdogob and Balanbale; Upsurge in domestic support for Somali President Siad Barre; United States delivers emergency military aid to Somalia; Ethiopian army and SSDF temporarily occupy the border towns of Galdogob and Balanbale
Sri Lankan Civil War	1983–2009	Liberation Tigers of Tamil Eelam; Other Tamil militant groups	Sri Lanka; India (1987–1990)	Sri Lankan government victory: Liberation Tigers of Tamil Eelam militarily defeated; Sri Lankan government reestablishes control over entire island; Collapse of the Tamil Eelam de facto Quasi-state; Tamil National Alliance drops its demand for a separate Tamil state; Transnational Government of Tamil Eelam established; Government regains total control of former LTTE-controlled areas in the North and East of the country
Thai–Laotian Border War	1987–1988	Laos; Vietnam; Soviet Union	Thailand; United States; Australia	Thai forces claimed to have secured 70% of ground around Hill 1428, while Lao forces still held high ground.; Return to status quo ante bellum.
Afghan Civil War	1989–1992	Republic of Afghanistan; Supported by: Soviet Union (until 1991); India; Commonwealth of Independent States (from 1991); Tajikistan; Turkmenistan; Uzbekistan; Russia (until January 1992)	Afghan Interim Government; Jamiat-e Islami; Hezb-e Islami Gulbuddin (until July 1989); National Islamic Front of Afghanistan; Ittehad-e Islami; Hezb-i Islami Khalis; Harakat-i Inqilab-i Islami; Independent Factions: Khalq (1990); Hezb-e Islami Gulbuddin (from July 1989) (Afghanistan) Junbish-i Milli (from 1992); Foreign Mujahideen: Al Qaeda; Maktab al-Khidamat; Various factions also fought among each other Supported by: Pakistan United States Saudi Arabia United Kingdom China Germany Iran	Afghan Interim Government victory; Dissolution of the Homeland Party Government; The Peshawar Accord leads to the creation of the Islamic State of Afghanistan on 28 April 1992; Continued civil war among Mujahideen forces

== Modern proxy wars ==
War	Dates	Combatant 1	Combatant 2	Result
Angolan Civil War	1975–2002	Democratic People's Republic of Angola: UNITA; FNLA (1975–1976); FNLA (1976–1978); South Africa (1975–1989); Zaire (1975) FLEC	People's Republic of Angola/Republic of Angola: MPLA; Cuba (1975–1989); SWAPO (1975–1989); ANC (1975–1989); Executive Outcomes (1993–1995); FLNC (1975–2001); Namibia (2001–2002) Military advisers and pilots: Soviet Union (1975–1989); East Germany (1975–1989); North Korea (1980s)	MPLA victory: Withdrawal of all foreign forces in 1989.; Transition towards a multiparty political system in 1991/92.; Dissolution of the armed forces of the FNLA.; Participation of UNITA and FNLA, as political parties, in the new political system, from 1991/92 onwards.; Jonas Savimbi, leader of UNITA, killed in 2002; UNITA abandoned armed struggle and participated in electoral politics.; Resistance of FLEC continued to this day
Indonesian occupation of East Timor	1975–2002	Indonesia; Timor Timur; Pro-Indonesian East Timorese factions; UDT; APODETI; KOTA; Trabalhista	(Timor-Leste) Democratic Republic of East Timor (Until 1976); East Timorese Resistance Groups; Fretilin (Falintil); CNRM; UDT	1999 East Timorese crisis; Indonesia retains a strong influence in East Timor; East Timor gains independence after an independence referendum votes to become an independent sovereign state
Insurgency in Laos	1975–Present	Lao PDR: Lao People's Revolutionary Party; Supported by: Vietnam: Vietnam People's Army (alleged direct involvement and intervention); Soviet Union (until 1989)	Lao Resistance Movement; Hmong insurgents; Supported by: Thailand (until 1990); United States (until 1990); (Kingdom of Laos) Neo Hom (1981–2007); Royalists: Lao National Liberation Front; Royal Lao Democratic Government (1982); Supported by: Royal Lao Government in Exile; China (until 1988) (Cambodia) Khmer Rouge (until 1999): (Cambodia) Democratic Kampuchea (until 1979); (Cambodia) Party of Democratic Kampuchea (1981–1990); Rightists: United Front for the Liberation of Laos; Supported by: Thailand (early to mid–1980s)	Lao People's Democratic Republic victory, crackdown of Human Rights in Laos
Chittagong Hill Tracts conflict	1977–1997	Bangladesh	Parbatya Chattagram Jana Samhati Samiti	Chittagong Hill Tracts Peace Accord
Nagorno-Karabakh conflict	1988–Present	Artsakh (Nagorno-Karabakh; until 2023) (Note: Formal dissolution on 1 January 2024) (Note: Nagorno-Karabakh Autonomous Oblast (NKAO) until 1991.); Armenia (Note: Armenian Soviet Socialist Republic (Soviet Armenia) until 1990 (renamed Republic of Armenia)/1991 (declared independence).); Military support Foreign fighters Arms suppliers Diplomatic support	Azerbaijan (from 1991); Soviet Union (until 1991) (Note: "Throughout the Soviet period, Moscow supported the Azerbaijani authorities against Armenian secessionists. "Until the dissolution of the USSR, the Soviet authorities sided, in general, with Azerbaijan. [...] Soviet troops sent to the conflict area [...] on numerous occasions, took the side of the Azerbaijani forces to 'punish' the Armenians for raising the NK issue." "Soviet troops have been in Nagorno-Karabakh for 2 1/2 years [...] The troops support armed Azerbaijani militias who have imposed a blockade of the region..." Soviet troops directly intervened during Operation Ring in April–May 1991 on the Azerbaijani side. It was essentially a "combined Soviet-Azerbaijan operation."): Azerbaijan SSR; Turkey (2020) (alleged by Armenia); Foreign fighters Arms suppliers Diplomatic support Supported by: Turkey (2020)	Guerrilla warfare: 1988–1991; First Nagorno-Karabakh War: 1992–1994; Low-intensity conflict: 1994–2020; Second Nagorno-Karabakh War: 2020; Low-intensity conflict: 2020–2023; Azerbaijani offensive: 2023; Armenian victory: 1994; Political stalemate and cold war: 1994–2020; Arms race and militarization; Azerbaijani victory: 2020; Border crisis: 2021–present; Blockade of Artsakh: 2022–2023; Azerbaijani victory: 2023; Disbandment of the Artsakh Defence Army: 2023; Negotiations started between Artsakh and Azerbaijan on 21 September 2023; Flight of Nagorno-Karabakh Armenians (2023); Artsakh dissolved on 1 January 2024; Continued Armenian-Azerbaijani border crisis; Armenia returned four villages captured during the First Nagorno-Karabakh War to Azerbaijan on 24 May 2024.; Azerbaijan gained control over all of Nagorno-Karabakh
Afghan Civil War	1989–1992	Republic of Afghanistan; Supported by: Soviet Union (until 1991); India; Commonwealth of Independent States (from 1991); Tajikistan; Turkmenistan; Uzbekistan; Russia (until January 1992)	Afghan Interim Government; Jamiat-e Islami; Hezb-e Islami Gulbuddin (until July 1989); National Islamic Front of Afghanistan; Ittehad-e Islami; Hezb-i Islami Khalis; Harakat-i Inqilab-i Islami; Independent Factions: Khalq (1990); Hezb-e Islami Gulbuddin (from July 1989) (Afghanistan) Junbish-i Milli (from 1992); Foreign Mujahideen: Al Qaeda; Maktab al-Khidamat; Various factions also fought among each other Supported by: Pakistan United States Saudi Arabia United Kingdom China Germany Iran	Afghan Interim Government victory; Dissolution of the Homeland Party Government; The Peshawar Accord leads to the creation of the Islamic State of Afghanistan on 28 April 1992; Continued civil war among Mujahideen forces
Transnistria War	1990–1992	/Moldova (Note: Soviet Socialist Republic of Moldova until 23 May 1991. Constituent republic of the Soviet Union until 27 August 1991.) Supported by: Romania	Transnistria; Russia; Supported by: Ukraine	Russian–Transnistrian victory: Transnistria is a de facto independent state, but remains internationally recognized as part of Moldova
Georgian Civil War	1991–1993	(Georgia (country)) Pro-Gamsakhurdia forces: 22 December 1991 – 6 January 1992 (Georgia (country)) Government of Georgia; National Guard of Georgia 6 January 1992 – March 1992 (Georgia (country)) National Disobedience Committee March 1992 – September 1993 (Georgia (country)) Gamsakhurdia's government-in-exile; Partisans; Units of the National Guard 2 September 1993 – 6 November 1993 (Georgia (country)) Zugdidi-based government 6 November 1993 – 31 December 1993 (Georgia (country)) Partisans; Supported by: Chechen Republic of Ichkeria	(Georgia (country)) Pro-Shevardnadze forces: 22 December 1991 – 6 January 1992 (Georgia (country)) Rebel factions of the National Guard Mkhedrioni Tetri Artsivi Merab Kostava Society Union of Afghans (Note: Georgians who fought for the Soviet army in Afghanistan); 2 January 1992 – 10 March 1992 (Georgia (country)) Military Council; Interim Government; 10 March 1992 – October 1992 (Georgia (country)) State Council; Interim Government; October 1992 – 31 December 1993 (Georgia (country)) Government of Georgia; Georgian Armed Forces; Internal Troops of Georgia; National Guard of Georgia; Supported by: Russia	Pro-Shevardnadzist victory: Exile and death of the first President of Georgia, Zviad Gamsakhurdia; Georgia joins the Commonwealth of Independent States
Yugoslav Wars	1991–2001	Slovenia; Bosnia; NATO; Supported by: Turkey; Pakistan; Iran; Saudi Arabia Croatia; Croatian Republic of Herzeg-Bosnia; Supported by: Albania National Liberation Army	(Socialist Federal Republic of Yugoslavia) SFR Yugoslavia (before 1992); FR Yugoslavia (from 1992); Republika Srpska; AP Western Bosnia; Republic of Serbian Krajina; Supported by: Russia; Greece Republic of Macedonia; Supported by: Ukraine(main arms supply); Bulgaria; FR Yugoslavia	Breakup of Yugoslavia and the formation of independent successor states
Tajikistani Civil War	1992–1997	United Tajik Opposition; Islamic Renaissance Party; Tajik Democratic Party; Party of People's Unity; Rastokhez Popular Movement; Lali Badakhshan; Afghanistan (until 1996): Jamiat-e Islami (until 1996); Supported by: al-Qaeda; (al-Qaeda) Islamic Movement of Uzbekistan; Taliban; Iran (alleged, denied by Iran)	/Tajikistan; Popular Front of Tajikistan; Communist Party of Tajikistan; Socialist Party of Tajikistan; /Russia; Uzbekistan /Kazakhstan (Kyrgyzstan) /Kyrgyzstan; Supported by: Belarus (weapons supplies); UNMOT: Austria; Bangladesh; Bulgaria; Czech Republic; Denmark; Ghana; Hungary; Indonesia; Jordan; Nepal; Nigeria; Poland; Switzerland; Ukraine; Uruguay	Armistice
Second Afar insurgency	1995–2018	ARDUF; RSADO	Ethiopia; Eritrea	Eritrean–Ethiopian War ended on 18 June 2000; Eritrean–Ethiopian border conflict ended on 8 July 2018
First Congo War	1996–1997	Zaire: FAZ; White Legion; Sudan; Chad (Rwanda) Ex-FAR/ALiR; Interahamwe; CNDD-FDD; UNITA; ADF; FLNC; Supported by: France; Central African Republic; China; Israel; Kuwait (denied) Mai-Mai (Note: Many Mai-Mai militias in eastern Zaire initially allied themselves with Rwanda and the AFDL against Hutu militants and refugees. As soon as most Hutu were driven away, however, many Mai-Mai groups turned against Rwanda and the AFDL. Despite this, some anti-Hutu Mai-Mai remained allied with Rwanda and the AFDL.)	(Democratic Republic of the Congo) AFDL; Rwanda; Uganda; Burundi; Angola (South Sudan) SPLA; Eritrea; Supported by: South Africa; Zambia; Zimbabwe; Ethiopia; Tanzania; United States (covertly) Mai-Mai	AFDL victory: Overthrow of the Mobutu regime; Zaire renamed back to the Democratic Republic of the Congo; Installation of Laurent-Désiré Kabila as president; Beginning of Second Congo War
Nepalese Civil War	1996–2006	Kingdom of Nepal: Nepalese Armed Forces; Royal Nepali Army; Nepal Police; Armed Police Force; Supported by: India; Pakistan; Belgium; China; United Kingdom; France; United States	Communist Party of Nepal (Maoist): People's Liberation Army, Nepal; Supported by: Communist Party of India (Maoist); Ceylon Communist Party (Maoist)	Comprehensive Peace Accord; Abolition of Nepalese monarchy
Second Republic of the Congo Civil War	1997–1999	Armed Forces of the Republic of the Congo (to October 1997); Cocoye Militia; Ninja Militia; Nsiloulou; Supported by: Jonas Savimbi; FLEC; Supported by: Democratic Republic of the Congo	Armed Forces of the Republic of the Congo (from October 1997); Cobra Militia (Rwanda) Rwandan Hutu Militia; Angola; Chad	Nguesso loyalist victory: Denis Sassou Nguesso returns to power
Guinea-Bissau Civil War	1998–1999	Guinea-Bissau; Senegal; Guinea; Supported by: France; Portugal	Military rebels MFDC; Supported by: United States	Ousting of President João Bernardo Vieira
First Ivorian Civil War	2002–2007	France; UNOCI	Ivory Coast; COJEP; Supported by: Belarus FNCI; Alleged support: Burkina Faso; Liberia	War agreement, followed by renewed conflict
War in Darfur	2003–2020	SRF (Note: Known as the National Redemption Front prior to 2011.) (2006–2020): JEM (2003–2020); SLA (some factions) (2003–2020); LJM (2010–11) (Note: Signed the Doha Darfur Peace Agreement in 2011.); SLA (some factions); SARC (2014–2020); SLFA (2017–2020): SLA-Unity; SLMJ; JEM (Jali); Supported by: South Sudan; Chad (2005–2010); Eritrea (until 2008); Libya (until 2011); Uganda (until 2015)	Sudan: SAF; Janjaweed; RSF; Chadian rebel groups Anti-Gaddafi forces (2011); Supported by: Libya (2011–2020); China; Iran (until 2016); Russia; Belarus; Syria (2000s, alleged) (United Nations) UNAMID (2007–2020)	Stalemate
Iraqi insurgency	2011–2013	(Iraq) Iraqi Government: Security forces; Private security contractors; Iraqi Kurdistan: Peshmerga; Asayish; CTG Kurdistan; Parastin u Zanyari; (Iraq) Sons of Iraq; Supported by: United States	Islamic State of Iraq (ISIL since April 2013); Islamic Army in Iraq; Naqshbandi Army; Other Sunni insurgents	Escalation of the insurgency, beginning of the War in Iraq (2013–2017): Significant increase in violence since the U.S. withdrawal, with an increasing number of insurgent large-scale attacks and assaults; Resurgence of ISI, later transforming to ISIL
First Libyan Civil War	2011	(Libya) Anti-Gaddafi forces Qatar NATO: Belgium; Bulgaria; Canada; Denmark; France; Greece; Italy; Netherlands; Norway; Poland (only humanitarian and medical aid); Romania; Spain; Turkey; United Kingdom; United States; Other countries: Jordan; Sweden; United Arab Emirates; Minor border clashes: Tunisia: Tunisian Army; Tunisian Police; Supported by: Egypt	Libyan Arab Jamahiriya	Libyan opposition/NATO victory: Complete overthrow and collapse of the Gaddafi regime.; Killing of Muammar Gaddafi and end of his rule over Libya on 20 October 2011; Start and continuation of the Libyan Crisis; Assumption of interim control by National Transitional Council (NTC); remained in power until August 8, 2012; UN authorisation of NATO led military intervention; Diplomatic recognition of NTC as sole governing authority for Libya by 105 countries, UN, EU, AL and AU; Factional violence in the aftermath of the war leading to another civil war between 2014–2020.
Syrian civil war	2011 (Note: Large-scale demonstrations in Syria began in 15 March 2011 and were subsequently suppressed by force by the Assad regime, it eventually led to an all-out civil war. In July 2011, defectors from Assad's regime formed an organized militia called the Free Syrian Army to protect protesters and strike back at Assad. The International Committee of the Red Cross said the violence in Syria had become so widespread that it was in a state of civil war in July 2012.)–2024	Syrian opposition Supported by: Saudi Arabia; Qatar; United States; Turkey; Libya; European Union; Australia; Egypt (2011–2013); France; United Kingdom; Jordan; Italy; Netherlands; Canada; Germany	Syria; Supported by: Armenia; Iran; Russia; Iraq; Pakistan; China; North Korea; Cuba; Venezuela; Algeria; Belarus; Angola; Egypt (from 2015); United Arab Emirates Rojava Supported by: United States; France; United Kingdom; Iraqi Kurdistan; CJTF-OIR	
Syrian Civil War spillover in Lebanon	2011–2017	Lebanon: Lebanese Armed Forces; Internal Security Forces; Support: Australia; Canada; China; Cyprus; Czech Republic; Egypt; France; Germany; Iran; Italy; Jordan; Netherlands; Russia; Saudi Arabia; South Korea; Spain; Turkey; United Kingdom; United States; Pro-Assad militant groups: Hezbollah; Lebanese Resistance Brigades; PFLP-GC; Amal Movement; Syrian Social Nationalist Party; DFLP; Popular Nasserist Organization; As-Sa'iqa; Fatah al-Intifada; Arab Democratic Party (until 2014); Armenian Revolutionary Federation; Arab Movement Party; Support: Ba'athist Syria; Iran; Russia; Other militias: Lebanese Communist Party; Fatah	Syrian rebel forces: Free Syrian Army; Saraya Ahl al-Sham (surrendered); Islamic Front (until 2015); Jaysh al-Islam; Future Movement; Support: Saudi Arabia; Al-Qaeda and allies: Al-Nusra Front^{[a]}; Fatah al-Islam; Ghuraba al-Sham (until 2013); Jund al-Sham; Hay'at Tahrir al-Sham (surrendered); Abdullah Azzam Brigades; Osbat al-Ansar; Sunni Resistance Committees; Muslim Youth; Islamic State (surrendered) (from 2013): Military of ISIL; Free Sunnis of Baalbek Brigade	Lebanese victory: The Lebanese Army and Hezbollah expelled IS militants as well as fighters of Al-Qaeda and its allies from Lebanon entirely in 2017 and reestablished control across all Lebanese territory.
Second Libyan Civil War	2014–2020	(Libya) House of Representatives (Tobruk-based): Libyan National Army; Libyan Air Force (LNA–aligned); Libyan Navy (LNA–aligned); Others: Zintan brigades; JEM (from 2016); SLM/A-Minnawi; Gaddafi loyalists; Popular Front for the Liberation of Libya; Warshefana militias; Wagner Group (from 2018) Egypt; United Arab Emirates; RSF (from 2019); Ba'athist Syria (2020); Hezbollah (allegedly); Israel (allegedly, denied by LNA); Iran Support: Russia; France; Saudi Arabia; Chad; Jordan; Belarus; Greece; Cyprus; United States; United Kingdom	(Libya) Government of National Accord (Tripoli-based) (from 2016): Libyan Ground Forces; Libyan Air Force (GNA–aligned); Libyan Navy (GNA–aligned); Others: Presidential Guard; Misrata Brigades; Sabratha Revolutionary Brigades; Petroleum Facilities Guard; Tripoli Protection Force (from 2018); Misratan Third Force; Tuareg militias of Ghat; Toubou Front for the Salvation of Libya; Chadian rebels (FACT, CCMSR, URF and UFDD); Turkey (2020) (Syrian opposition) Syrian National Army (from 2019) (Yemen) Popular Resistance Committees; Hamas (LNA claim, denied by Hamas) Support: Qatar; Sudan (until 2019); Pakistan; Iran; Morocco; Malta; Italy; European Union (except Greece, Cyprus and France); United Kingdom; United States (until 2019); Ukraine; Algeria; United Nations; (Libya) National Salvation Government (2014–2017): Libya Dawn Coalition; Libya Shield Force; LROR; Libyan National Guard; Support: Sudan (2014–16); Turkey (2014–16); Qatar (2014–16); Iran (allegedly); Ukraine; Islamic State (from 2014): Wilayat Barqa; Wilayat Tarabulus; Wilayat Fezzan; Support: AQIM (2014–2015; alleged in 2016); Al-Qaeda: Al-Qaeda in the Islamic Maghreb; Shura Council of Benghazi Revolutionaries (2014–2017) SCBR militia: Ansar al-Sharia (2014–2017); Libya Shield 1 (2014–16); Rafallah al-Sahati Brigade; February 17th Martyrs Brigade; Others: Shura Council of Mujahideen in Derna (until 2018); Al-Mourabitoun (2015–2018); (Libya) Benghazi Defense Brigades (2016); Ajdabiya Revolutionaries Shura Council (2015–16); (Libya) Derna Protection Force (2018–2019)	Ceasefire: Permanent ceasefire ratified on 23 October 2020; LNA failed to conquer Tripoli; Government of National Unity formed on 10 March 2021; Continued Libyan Crisis

== Ongoing proxy wars ==
War	Dates	Combatant 1	Combatant 2
Xinjiang conflict	1933–present	East Turkestan independence movement; Turkistan Islamic Party (1997–present); East Turkestan Liberation Organization (2000–2003); East Turkistan Education and Solidarity Association(denied by ETESA); ETPRP (1968–1989); URFET (1968–2004); Second East Turkestan Republic (1944–1946); Various small groups; First East Turkestan Republic (1933–1934)	People's Republic of China (from 1949); Chinese Communist Party; People's Police; People's Armed Police; People's Liberation Army; Bingtuan; Republic of China (until 1950s); Kuomintang; National Revolutionary Army (1931–1947); Republic of China Army (1947–1950s); Ma clique (1931–1949); Xinjiang (1912–1933; 1944–1949); Xinjiang (1933–1944); People's Anti-Imperialist Association
Israeli-Palestinian conflict	Late 19th / early 20th century–present	(Palestine) Palestinians: Pre–1948: Muslim-Christian Associations; Palestine Arab Congress; Arab Higher Committee; 1948–present: 1948: Arab Higher Committee; All-Palestine Protectorate; Army of the Holy War; 1949–1956: Palestinian fedayeen (Note: The 1949–1956 Palestinian fedayeen insurgency culminated in the 1956 Suez Crisis.); 1964–2005: PLO (1964–2005) (Note: The Palestinian Authority was created by and is ultimately accountable to the PLO (see Palestinian Authority#Government and politics). Under the administration of Mahmoud Abbas (2005–present), the PA has coordinated security with Israel and worked to suppress anti-Israel militants.); UNLU (1987–1993) (Note: During the First Intifada.); Palestinian Authority (1994–2005) (Note: Under the administration of Mahmoud Abbas (2005–present), the PA has coordinated security with Israel and worked to suppress anti-Israel militants.); 2007–present: Hamas government; Palestinian Joint Operations Room (2018–present) (Note: Consists of the armed wings of Hamas and allied Palestinian militant organizations.)	Israel and Zionist predecessors: Pre–1948: Yishuv: Bar-Giora; Hashomer; Haganah; Irgun; Lehi; 1948–present: State of Israel: Israel Defense Forces; Israeli settlers (since 1967)
Balochistan conflict	1948–present	Baloch separatist groups; Sectarian groups	Pakistan; Iran
Internal conflict in Myanmar	1948–present	Union of Burma (1948–1962); Socialist Republic of the Union of Burma (1962–1988); Union of Myanmar (1988–2011); Myanmar (since 2011); SAC (since 2021)	National Unity Government (since 2021); People's Defence Force; Ethnic armed organisations (Note: The government of Myanmar refers to all insurgent groups as "ethnic armed organisations", including groups like the All Burma Students' Democratic Front and Communist Party of Burma, which do not fight for a specific ethnic group's interests.)
Papua conflict	1962–present	Indonesia Papua New Guinea	Free Papua Movement
Insurgency in Northeast India	1954–present	Separatist groups: UNLFW; NDFB (1986–2020); National Socialist Council of Nagaland; United Liberation Front of Asom; Kamtapur Liberation Organisation; CorCom; United National Liberation Front (1964–2023); People's Liberation Army of Manipur; Kangleipak Communist Party; People's Revolutionary Party of Kangleipak; Kanglei Yawol Kanna Lup; Maoist Communist Party of Manipur; Zomi Revolutionary Army (1997–2005); Kuki National Army; Tani Army; National Liberation Front of Tripura (1989–2024); All Tripura Tiger Force (1990–2024); Karbi Longri N.C. Hills Liberation Front (2004–21); BLTF (1996-03); Other: Garo National Liberation Army (2009–18); Hynniewtrep National Liberation Council (2000–10); People's Democratic Council of Karbi Longri (2016–21); Adivasi Cobra Force (1996–2012); Mizo National Front (1954–86); Tripura National Volunteers (1978–88); Dima Halam Daogah (2009–13); United People's Democratic Solidarity (1999–2014); Supported by: China (claimed by India); Myanmar (until 2018); Bhutan (until 2003); CPI (Maoist); Jihadist groups: MULT Assam (1996–2016); AQIS (2016–present)	India; Indian Armed Forces; Central Reserve Police Force; Border Security Force; SULFA; Supported by: Bhutan (from 2003); Bangladesh (from 1971); Myanmar (from 2018)
Naxalite–Maoist insurgency	1967–present	India; Indian Armed Forces; Central Reserve Police Force; Border Security Force; State Armed Police Forces; District Reserve Guard; Militias: (until 2011): Tritiya Prastuti Committee; Salwa Judum; Sunlight Sena; Kuer Sena; Ranvir Sena; Bhumi Sena; Lorik Sena	Naxalites; CPI (Maoist); PLGA; JJP; PLFI; RCC (2006–2019); OMP (2002–2015); CPI(ML) Liberation (1974–1992); Lal Sena; CPI(ML) Janashakti (1992–2013); CPUSI (1997–2005); CPI(ML) ND; CPI(ML) MM (until 2012); ABNES (until 2002); TNLA (until 2005); Supported by: ULFA; NSCN; PLA-MP; MCPM; KCP; Declared support: International Communist League; CPN (Maoist); CPN (2014); NPA; PBSP (until 2021); PBCP (until 2021); CIC (until 1977); CCP (Maoist) (until 1976)
Civil conflict in the Philippines	1969–present	Communists; Communist Party; New People's Army; ...full list; Jihadist groups; (Islamic State) Bangsamoro Islamic Freedom Fighters	Philippines; Armed Forces; National Police
Cabinda War	1975–present	FLEC; FLEC-FAC; Communist Committee of Cabinda; Republic of Cabinda (1975–1976, 1999); Zaire (1975)	Angola; Cuba (until 1991); Democratic People's Republic of Angola (1991); UNITA (joint operations, 1991); Military advisers and pilots: East Germany (until 1989); Soviet Union (until 1989)
Civil conflict in Turkey	1976–present	TAK; TKP/ML-TİKKO; MKP-HKO-PHG; Maoist Party; Maoist Party Centre; THKO; Devrimci Yol; DHKP-C Supported by: Soviet Union; ASALA (1970s–1988); Syria; Greece; Cyprus; Iran; Iraq (until 2003); Libya (until 2011)	Turkey Supported by: Turkic Council
Iran–Saudi Arabia proxy conflict	1979–present	Saudi Arabia Proxies: FSA (until 2017); Syria (since 2024); KDPI; Jaish ul-Adl; PJAK; Komala; LNA; ANR; ASMLA; PAK; Yemen; JRTN (from 2006); LF; Sipah-e-Sahaba Pakistan	Iran Proxies: Hezbollah Al-Hejaz; OIRAP(1979–1988); Liwa Fatemiyoun; Houthis; Syria (until 2024); Popular Mobilization Forces; Al-Ashtar Brigades; Al-Mukhtar Brigades; Hezbollah; Hamas; Hüseynçilər; Muslim Brotherhood; Liwa Zainebiyoun; IMN; Sipah-e-Muhammad Pakistan
Internal conflict in Peru	1980–present	Shining Path (PCP-SL); CBMR (since 2001); CRH (2004–2012); FARC dissidents; Supported by: FUDEPP (since 2014); Hezbollah (since 2016); ICL (since 2022); Libya (until 2011); ANO (1988); FARC-EP (until 2016); MOVADEF (2009–2024); RIM (1984–2012); MPCP (Note: Until 2018, the Militarized Communist Party of Peru (MPCP) was unofficially referred to as the "Shining Path remnants" (Remanentes de Sendero Luminoso) or as the "Shining Path in the VRAEM" (Sendero Luminoso en el VRAEM). The Peruvian government continues to refer to the MPCP as the direct successor to the Shining Path.) Supported by: China (self-claim); ASPRET (until 2022); Ethnocacerists Supported by: ASPRET (2011–2022); Hezbollah; MPCP (until 2022); FAR-EPT (Note: The Revolutionary Armed Forces – Tupacamarist People's Army (Fuerzas Armadas Revolucionarias – Ejército Popular Tupacamarista) was established in 2015 by Julio César Vásquez Vásquez, a former member of the MRTA.); MRTA (1982–1997); Supported by: Cuba (denied); Libya; Soviet Union; FMLN; M-19; FSLN	Government of Peru Supported by: Rondas campesinas (Note: These autonomous units have been organised by the Armed Forces since 1982, taking the name of "Self-Defence Committees" (CAD) since 1991. Since its establishment in 2006, most rondas have been organised under the Sole National Central of Peasant Rounds of Peru (CUNARC-P).); ASPRET (since 2023); International support: China; Colombia; Cuba; Japan; North Korea; Russia; Soviet Union; Spain; United States
Abkhaz–Georgian conflict	1989–present	Georgian SSR (before 1990); (Georgia (country)) (Georgia (country)) Georgia (after 1990); (Georgia (country)) Zviadists (1991–1998); Supported by: Chechen Republic of Ichkeria (2001); UNA-UNSO (1992–1993); White Legion (1992–1998); Mkhedrioni (1991–1998); Forest Brotherhood (1992–1998)	Abkhaz ASSR (before 1992); Abkhazia (after 1992); Supported by: CMPC (1992–1993); Russia; Kuban Cossacks; Don Cossacks; South Ossetia
Georgian–Ossetian conflict	1989–present	Georgian SSR (before 1990) (Georgia (country)) Georgia (after 1990)	South Ossetia; Russia
Insurgency in Jammu and Kashmir	1989–present	India; Indian Armed Forces; Indian Army; Central Armed Police Force; Jammu and Kashmir Police	Political Parties: APHC; JIJK; Armed groups: JKLF (until 1992); Lashkar-e-Taiba; JeM; MJC; Hizbul Mujahideen; PAFF; TRF; DeM (until 2018); HUM (until 2001); HuJI; Al-Badr (until 2022); Al-Umar-Mujahideen (until 2006); Other separatist movements & insurgent militant groups; AQIS; Ansar Ghazwat-ul-Hind (until 2022); Supported by: Pakistan; Al-Qaeda; D-Company; Islamic State; (Islamic State) IS Hind; ISJK (until 2019)
Allied Democratic Forces insurgency	1996–present	Uganda; DR Congo; Armed Forces (FARDC); MONUSCO; (United Nations) Force Intervention Brigade	ADF (1996–2015); NALU; ISIL; IS-CAP; ADF-Baluku; ADF-Mukulu; NALU; RCD/K-ML; APC; Mai-Mai Kyandenga (2020–present); Supported by: FARDC elements; LRA; Al-Shabaab (disputed); Various Jihadi groups (Ugandan and MONUSCO claim); Sudan (1990s; currently unknown)
Yemeni civil war	2014–present	Yemen (Hadi government) (Saudi Arabia) Saudi-led coalition Supported by: Somalia; United States; Eritrea; United Kingdom; France; Pakistan; Canada; Italy; Turkey; Germany; South Korea	Yemen (Supreme Political Council) Supported by: Iran; Iraq; North Korea; Russia; Syria
Sudanese civil war (2023–present)	2023–present	Sudanese Government; Sudanese Armed Forces; Sudanese Army; Sudanese Navy; Sudanese Air Force; Republican Guard; PDF; Popular Resistance; Al-Bara Battalion; AWB; SPLM–N (Agar); JEM; SLM (Minnawi); SLM (Tambour) (from August 2023); Darfur Joint Protection Force (from November 2023); Egypt; Saudi Arabia	(Sudan) Government of Peace and Unity (from April 2025); Rapid Support Forces; Non-RSF Janjaweed militias; SPLM–N (al-Hilu) (from February 2025); United Arab Emirates; Ethiopia (from October 2025); Tamazuj (from August 2023) (Central African Republic) Coalition of Patriots for Change; Desert Wolves; Libyan National Army; Wagner Group (until early 2024): Liberated Areas; SLM (al-Nur); New Sudan; SPLM-N (al-Hilu) (June 2023 – February 2025)
