= Counter-revolutionary =

Someone who opposes a revolution

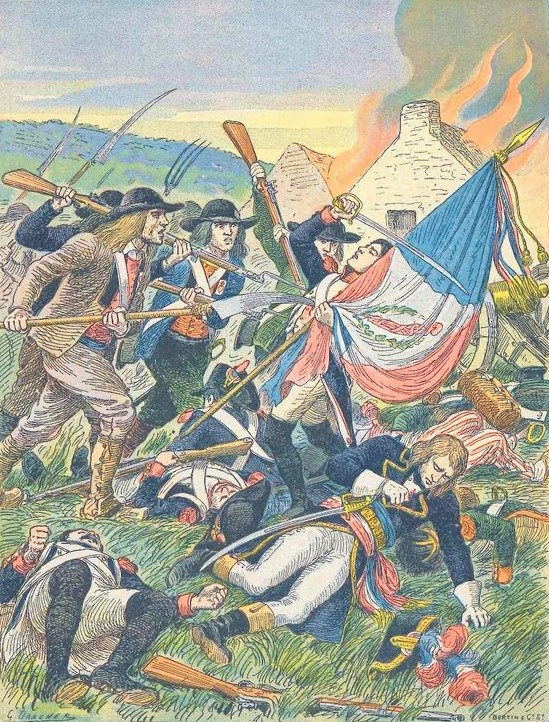
The War in the Vendée was a royalist uprising against revolutionary France in 1793–1796.

A counter-revolutionary or an anti-revolutionary is anyone who opposes or resists a revolution, particularly one who acts after a revolution has occurred, in order to try to overturn it or reverse its course, in full or in part. The adjective "counter-revolutionary" pertains to movements that would restore the state of affairs or the principles that prevailed during a pre-revolutionary era.

== Definition ==
A counter-revolution is opposition or resistance to a revolutionary movement. It can refer to attempts to defeat a revolutionary movement before it takes power, as well as attempts to restore the old regime after a successful revolution.

== Europe ==
=== France ===
The word "counter-revolutionary" originally referred to thinkers who opposed themselves to the 1789 French Revolution, such as Joseph de Maistre, Louis de Bonald or, later, Charles Maurras, the founder of the Action Française monarchist movement. More recently, it has been used in France to describe political movements that reject the legacy of the 1789 Revolution, which historian René Rémond has referred to as légitimistes.

Thus, monarchist supporters of the Ancien Régime following the French Revolution were counter-revolutionaries, as were supporters of the War in the Vendée and of the monarchies that put down the various Revolutions of 1848. The royalist legitimist counter-revolutionary French movement survives to this day, albeit marginally. It was active during the Révolution nationale of Vichy France, though, which has been considered by René Rémond not as a fascist regime but as a counter-revolutionary regime, whose motto was Travail, Famille, Patrie ("Work, Family, Fatherland"), which replaced the Republican motto Liberté, égalité, fraternité.

After the French Revolution, anti-clerical policies and the execution of King Louis XVI led to the War in the Vendée. The suppression of this counter-revolution produced what is considered by some historians to be the first modern genocide. Monarchists and Catholics took up arms against the revolutionary French Republic in 1793 after the government asked that 300,000 men be conscripted into the Republican military in the levée en masse. The Vendeans also rose up against Napoleon's attempt to conscript them in 1815.

=== Germany ===
The German Empire, and its predecessors the Holy Roman Empire and German Confederation, operated under counterrevolutionary principles, with these monarchical federations crushing attempted uprisings in, for example, 1848. After the 1867–71 creation of a new German realm by Prussia, chancellor Otto von Bismarck used policies favored by Socialists, such as state-sponsored healthcare, to undercut the opponents of the monarchy and protect it against revolution. Not long after the German Revolution of 1918–1919 and signing of the Treaty of Versailles, a failed coup d'état known as the Kapp Putsch was instigated by elements opposed to the Weimar Republic. It was led principally by Wolfgang Kapp and Walther von Lüttwitz.

During the Weimar era, the German Realm became an ideological battlefield between "red" and "white" factions. The state became bifurcated between the conservative Junker nobility which dominated the army and other high offices, including the presidency with Field Marshal Paul von Hindenburg, and the leftist revolutionaries who attempted several coups in the 1920s and later gained a base in parliament via the Communist Party of Germany, which, being internationalist in nature, opposed the extremist nationalism of the new Nazi Party. The Nazis, by making common cause with the counterrevolutionaries against the Communists, effected a takeover of the German state. At first under the adopted imagery of the monarchical era, and later, after the death of Hindenburg, under purely Nazi imagery.

The Nazis did not publicly characterise themselves as counterrevolutionaries. They condemned the traditional German forces of conservatism (e.g., Prussian monarchists, Junkers, and Roman Catholic clergy). For example, the Nazi Party march Die Fahne hoch labeled them as reactionaries (Reaktion) and counted them together with the Roter Frontkämpferbund as enemies of the Nazis. Nevertheless, in practice the Nazis supported many of the same ideas as the counterrevolutionary factions and virulently opposed revolutionary Marxism, using the conservative Freikorps to crush Communist uprisings, ostensibly idealising German tradition, folklore, and heroes, such as Frederick the Great.

The fact that the Nazis called their 1933 rise to power the national revolution showed that they understood the popular hunger for some type of radical change; nonetheless, they understood the equally powerful popular impulse toward stability and continuity, and rejected the parliamentarianism of the Weimar Constitution as merely a first step towards Bolshevism. Thus, for instance, they catered to reactionary tendencies among the German people by propagandistic demonstrations linking the Nazi state to the traditional Reich ("realm" or "empire") by referring to it informally as the "Drittes Reich" ("Third Empire"), implying a specious continuity between it and the historic German entities appealing to German reactionaries: the Holy Roman Empire (the "First Realm") and the German Empire (the "Second Realm"). (See also reactionary modernism.)

=== Portugal ===
In 1919, Portuguese Monarchists in Porto led by Paiva Couceiro tried a counterrevolution against the First Portuguese Republic, advocating for the restoration of the Monarchy under exiled King Manuel II. The Monarchists proclaimed the restoration of the Monarchy on the balcony of the Porto City Hall. Supporters of the republic used the pejorative term "Traulitânia" to refer to the counterrevolutionaries.

=== United Kingdom ===
Many historians have held that the rise and spread of Methodism in the United Kingdom prevented the development of a revolution there. In addition to preaching the Christian Gospel, John Wesley and his Methodist followers visited those imprisoned, as well as the poor and aged, building hospitals and dispensaries which provided free healthcare for the masses. The sociologist William H. Swatos stated that "Methodist enthusiasm transformed men, summoning them to assert rational control over their own lives, while providing in its system of mutual discipline the psychological security necessary for autonomous conscience and liberal ideals to become internalized, an integrated part of the 'new men'… regenerated by Wesleyan preaching."

The practice of temperance among Methodists, as well as their rejection of gambling, allowed them to eliminate secondary poverty and accumulate capital. Individuals who attended Methodist chapels and Sunday schools "took into industrial and political life the qualities and talents they had developed within Methodism and used them on behalf of the working classes in non-revolutionary ways."

The spread of the Methodist Church in the United Kingdom, author and professor Michael Hill states, "filled both a social and an ideological vacuum" in English society, thus "opening up the channels of social and ideological mobility… which worked against the polarization of English society into rigid social classes." The historian Bernard Semmel argues that "Methodism was an antirevolutionary movement that succeeded (to the extent that it did) because it was a revolution of a radically different kind" that was capable of effecting social change on a large scale.

=== Italy ===
In Italy, after being occupied by the French army in the late 18th century, there was a counter-revolution in all the French client republics. The most well-known was the Sanfedismo, a reactionary movement led by the cardinal Fabrizio Ruffo, which overthrew the Parthenopean Republic and allowed the Bourbon dynasty to return to the throne of the Kingdom of Naples.

A resurgence of the phenomenon happened during the Napoleon's second Italian campaign in the early 19th century. Another example of counter-revolution was the peasants' rebellion in Southern Italy after the national unification, fomented by the Bourbon government in exile and the Papal States. The revolt, labelled pejoratively by opponents as brigandage, resulted in a bloody civil war that lasted almost ten years.

=== Austria ===
In the Austrian Empire, a revolt took place against Napoleon called the Tyrolean Rebellion in 1809. Led by a Tyrolean innkeeper by the name of Andreas Hofer, 20,000 Tyrolean rebels fought successfully against Napoleon's troops. Hofer was ultimately betrayed by the Treaty of Schönbrunn, which led to the disbandment of his troops and was captured and executed in 1810.

=== Spain ===
The Spanish Civil War was a counter-revolution. Supporters of Carlism, monarchy, and nationalism (see Falange) joined forces against the (Second) Spanish Republic in 1936. The counter-revolutionaries saw the Spanish Constitution of 1931 as a revolutionary document that defied Spanish culture, tradition and religion. On the Republican side, the acts of the Communist Party of Spain against the rural collectives are also sometimes considered counter-revolutionary. The Carlist cause began with the First Carlist War in 1833 and continues to the present.

=== Russia ===
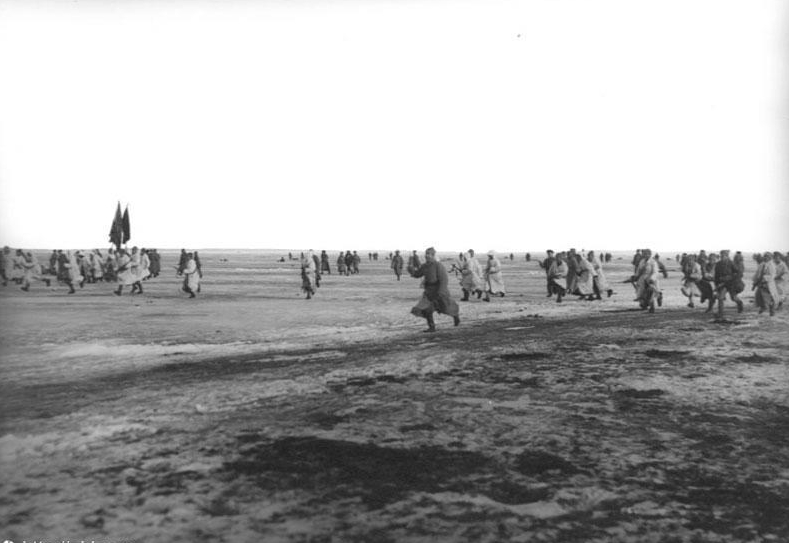
Red Army troops attack Kronstadt sailors in March 1921.

The White Army and its supporters who tried to defeat the Bolsheviks after the October Revolution, as well as the German politicians, police, soldiers and Freikorps who crushed the German Revolution of 1918–1919, were also counter-revolutionaries. The Bolshevik government tried to build an anti-revolutionary image for the Green armies composed of peasant rebels. The largest peasant rebellion against Bolshevik rule occurred in 1920–21 in Tambov.

== Hispanic America ==
General Victoriano Huerta, and later the Felicistas, attempted to thwart the Mexican Revolution in the 1910s. In the late 1920s, Mexican Catholics took up arms against the Mexican Federal Government in what became known as the Cristero War. The President of Mexico, Plutarco Elias Calles, was elected in 1924. Calles began carrying out anti-Catholic policies which caused peaceful resistance from Catholics in 1926.

The counter-revolution began as a movement of peaceful resistance against the anti-clerical laws. In the summer of 1926, fighting broke out. The fighters known as Cristeros fought the government due to its suppression of the Church, jailing and execution of priests, formation of a nationalist schismatic church, state atheism, Socialism, Freemasonry and other harsh anti-Catholic policies.

The 1961 Bay of Pigs invasion into Cuba was conducted by counter-revolutionaries who hoped to overthrow the revolutionary government of Fidel Castro. In the 1980s, the Contra-Revolución rebels fighting to overthrow the revolutionary Sandinista government in Nicaragua. In fact, the Contras received their name precisely because they were counter-revolutionaries.

The Black Eagles, the AUC, and other paramilitary movements of Colombia can also be seen as counter-revolutionary. These right-wing groups are opposition to the FARC, and other left-wing guerrilla movements.

Some counter-revolutionaries are former revolutionaries who supported the initial overthrow of the previous regime, but came to differ with those who ultimately came to power after the revolution. For example, some of the Contras originally fought with the Sandinistas to overthrow Anastasio Somoza, and some of those who oppose Castro also opposed Batista.

== Asia ==
=== Japan ===
During the mid-19th century Bakumatsu, especially during the Japanese civil war of 1868–1869, the pro-bakufu forces and especially the samurai, and after the period, ex-samurai, were left without money since their skills are obsolete. They banded up with the eastern shogunate led by the Shogun Tokugawa Yoshinobu who wished to drive foreign and especially Western European and North American influence against the revolutionaries of Emperor Meiji, who sought to modernize Japan with the states of Western Europe as Japan's example. The war ended with a small number of casualties, mostly samurai. Years later, western samurai and imperial modernists engaged in the deadlier Satsuma Rebellion.

=== China ===
In 1917, during the Warlord Era general Zhang Xun attempted to reverse the 1911 Revolution that brought an end to the Qing dynasty by seizing Beijing in the Manchu Restoration.

The anti-communist (and thus, the counter-revolutionary) Kuomintang party in China used the term "counter-revolutionary" to disparage the communists and other opponents of its regime. Chiang Kai-shek, the Kuomintang party leader, was the chief user of this term.

The reason as to why the nominally conservative Kuomintang used this terminology was that during its origins, its ideology was influenced by several leftist revolutionary ideas. The Kuomintang, and Chiang Kai-shek used the words "feudal" and "counter-revolutionary" as synonyms for evil, and backwardness, and proudly proclaimed themselves to be revolutionary. Chiang called the warlords feudalists, and called for feudalism and counter-revolutionaries to be stamped out by the Kuomintang. Chiang showed extreme rage when he was called a warlord, because of its negative, feudal connotations.

Chiang also crushed and dominated the merchants of Shanghai in 1927, seizing loans from them, with the threats of death or exile. Rich merchants, industrialists, and entrepreneurs were arrested by Chiang, who accused them of being "counter-revolutionary", and Chiang held them until they gave money to the Kuomintang. Chiang's arrests targeted rich millionaires, accusing them of communism and counter-revolutionary activities. Chiang also enforced an anti-Japanese boycott, sending his agents to sack the shops of those who sold Japanese made items and fining them. He also disregarded the internationally protected International Settlement, putting cages on its borders in which he threatened to place the merchants. The Kuomintang's alliance with the Green Gang allowed it to ignore the borders of the foreign concessions.

A similar term was also used in the People's Republic of China, which includes charges such as collaborating with foreign forces and inciting revolts against the government and the ruling CCP. According to Article 28 of the Chinese constitution, The state maintains public order and suppresses treasonable and other counter-revolutionary activities; It penalizes actions that endanger public security and disrupt the socialist economy and other criminal activities, and punishes and reforms criminals.

The term was widely used during the Cultural Revolution, in which thousands of intellectuals and government officials were denounced as "counter-revolutionaries" by the Red Guards. Following the end of the Cultural Revolution, the term was also used against Lin Biao and the Gang of Four.

== Africa ==
=== Egypt ===
After the overthrow of Hosni Mubarak's authoritarian government in the 2011 Egyptian revolution, counter-revolutionary forces led by Abdel-Fattah Al Sisi subsequently overthrew the democratically elected president Mohamed Morsi and established an authoritarian regime under Sisi.

On 1 February 2012, the biggest tragedy in Egyptian football resulted in the deaths of at least 74 people. It happened exactly one year after Mubarak announced in a speech that there would be chaos if he stepped down, and on the same date when armed thugs attacked participants in the 2011 revolution. Some photographic and video evidence showed that police and security forces in the stadium were unwilling to respond to the riot. Many argue that the riot was planned as revenge against Ultras Ahlawy, the rowdy al-Ahly supporters who had taken part in the 2011 revolution and were known for their constant anti-governmental chants in football matches.

In July 2013, Defense Minister Abdel-Fattah Al Sisi overthrew the president Mohamed Morsi, the first president democratically elected by the Egyptian people since the proclamation of the republic in 1953. The counter-revolution ended when Al Sisi was sworn in as Egypt's 6th president in June 2014.

== Philosophical perspectives ==
In the Laws, Plato relates a dialogue between Cleinias of Crete and an unnamed Athenian interlocutor. Part of their discourse touches on counter-revolution. Cleinias posits that a state can be considered morally superior when the virtuous citizens triumph over the unruly masses and the less virtuous classes. He asserts, "the state in which the better citizens win a victory over the mob and over the inferior classes may be truly said to be better than itself, and may be justly praised."

However, the Athenian presents a hypothetical scenario wherein someone must pass judgment on a group of brothers, some of whom are behaving justly while others are acting unjustly. When questioned about the optimal resolution, Cleinias suggests that the most effective judge would not necessarily be one who imposes the just to govern over the unjust, whether by force or consent. Instead, he advocates for a judge who facilitates reconciliation by establishing a mutually agreed-upon set of laws designed to maintain harmony among them. This implies Cleinias' belief that a counter-revolutionary victory by the "better citizens" over "the mob" need not involve violence but can be attained through the enactment of just legislation.
