= List of wars involving South Africa =

This is a list of wars involving the Union of South Africa and its successor, the Republic of South Africa.

Conflict	South Africa and allies	Opponents	Results	Prime Minister (1912–94) President (1994–)	Losses
World War I (1914–1918)	Allied Powers: France; United Kingdom; and Empire: Australia; Canada; Ceylon; Egypt; Newfoundland; New Zealand; India; South Africa; Russia (Note: The Russian Empire during 1914–1917, the Russian Republic during 1917. The Bolshevik government signed a separate peace with the Central Powers shortly after their armed seizure of power, resulting in a Central Powers victory on the Eastern Front of the war, and the Russian Soviet Federative Socialist Republic's defeat. However, this peace treaty was nullified by an Allied Powers victory on the Western Front, and the end of the war.); Italy (from 1915); United States (from 1917); Japan; and others ...	Central Powers: Germany; Austria-Hungary; Ottoman Empire; Bulgaria (from 1915); and others ...	Victory: Partition of the Ottoman Empire, dissolution of Austria-Hungary, transfer of German colonies and territories to other countries; Formation of new countries in Europe and the Middle East, such as Poland, Yugoslavia, Weimar Germany, Soviet Russia and Soviet Union, Lithuania, Estonia, Latvia, Austria, Hungary, Czechoslovakia, Turkey, Hejaz, and Yemen	Louis Botha	9,726 dead
Maritz Rebellion (1914–1915)	British Empire: Union of South Africa	South African Republic; Supported by: German Empire	Government victory: Rebellion suppressed; South Africa occupies German South West Africa; Rise of the National Party	Louis Botha	9,726 dead
Russian Civil War (1918–1920)	(Russia) White Movement; United Kingdom; United States; France; Japan; Italy; China; Canada; Australia; India; South Africa; Czechoslovakia; Poland; Greece; Romania; Yugoslavia; Estonia	Russian SFSR; Far Eastern Republic; Latvian SSR; Ukrainian SSR; Commune of Estonia; Mongolian Communists	Defeat (limited involvement): Allied withdrawal from Russia; Defeat of the White Movement	Louis Botha	Unknown
Rand Rebellion (1921–1922)	Union of South AfricaSouth Africa	South African Communist Party	Government victory: Rebellion suppressed	Jan Smuts	153 dead (both sides)
Bondelswarts Rebellion (1922)	South Africa: South West Africa	Bondelswarts	Government victory: Rebellion suppressed	Jan Smuts	100 dead, 468 wounded (Bondelswarts)
World War II (1939–1945)	Soviet Union; United States; United Kingdom; China; France; Poland; Yugoslavia; Greece; Netherlands; Belgium; Luxembourg; Denmark; Norway; Czechoslovakia; Canada; Australia; New Zealand; India; South Africa; Philippines (Ethiopian Empire) Ethiopia; Brazil; Mexico (Mongolian People's Republic) Mongolia	Germany; Japan; Italy; Romania; Hungary; Bulgaria; Slovakia; Croatia; Finland; Thailand; Iraq	Victory: Collapse of the German Reich; Fall of Japanese and Italian Empires; Creation of the United Nations; Emergence of the United States and the Soviet Union as superpowers; Beginning of the Cold War	Jan Smuts	6,840 dead 1,841 missing 14,589 prisoners
Greek Civil War (1944–1945)	(Kingdom of Greece) Cairo Government; United Kingdom; South Africa	(Greece) ELAS	Victory: Treaty of Varkiza	Jan Smuts	None
Korean War (1950–1953)	South Korea; United States; United Kingdom; Canada; Turkey; Australia (Ethiopian Empire) Ethiopia; Philippines; New Zealand; Thailand; Greece; France; Colombia; Belgium; South Africa; Netherlands; Luxembourg	North Korea; China; Soviet Union	Stalemate: The Korean Armistice Agreement; North Korean invasion of South Korea repelled; UN invasion of North Korea repelled; Chinese invasion of South Korea repelled; Korean Demilitarized Zone established; Little territorial change at the 38th parallel border	D. F. Malan	34 dead 9 prisoners
Rhodesian Bush War (1965–1979)	Rhodesia (1964–1979); Zimbabwe-Rhodesia (1979); Portugal (1964–1974) (Note: Portuguese forces assisted the Rhodesians in cross-border operations into Portuguese Mozambique. See Operation Flotilla and Operation Birch.); South Africa (from 1967)	ZANU (ZANLA); ZAPU (ZIPRA); (People's Republic of Mozambique) Mozambique; ANC (MK); Zambia	Stalemate Lancaster House Agreement: End to armed hostilities; Free elections with ZANU and ZAPU participation; Formation of Zimbabwe; Rhodesia disestablished; Zimbabwe gains internationally recognised independence in its place.	B. J. Vorster	Unknown
Mozambican Civil War (1978–1985)	RENAMO; Zimbabwe-Rhodesia; South Africa	(Mozambique) FRELIMO; ANC	Stalemate (limited involvement): Non-aggression pact (Nkomati Accord)	P. W. Botha	Unknown
South African Border War (1966–1989)	South Africa; Portugal; UNITA; FNLA	SWAPO; SWANU; MPLA; Cuba; ANC; Zambia	Stalemate: Withdrawal of foreign forces from Angola; Namibian independence from South African rule	P. W. Botha	2,038 dead
Natal Civil War (1987–1994)	IFP	ANC	Stalemate: Violence subsided following 1994 elections	P. W. Botha	Unknown
Operation Boleas (1998)	South Africa; Botswana	(Lesotho) LDF rebels	Victory: Suspected coup d'état in Lesotho quelled	Nelson Mandela	11 dead
Battle of Bangui (2013)	South Africa; Central African Republic	(Central African Republic) Séléka	Disputed: François Bozizé successfully escorted to safety, Rebel advance towards South African base repelled	Jacob Zuma	15 dead
M23 Rebellion (2012-2013)	Democratic Republic of the Congo (United Nations) MONUSCO: (United Nations) Force Intervention Brigade; South Africa; Tanzania; Malawi	March 23 Movement; Alleged support: Uganda; Rwanda	Victory: M23 disarms and demobilises	Jacob Zuma	None
ADF Insurgency (2014–present)	DR Congo; Uganda; South Africa; Tanzania; Malawi	ADF	Ongoing: UNF Intervention Brigade intervention from 2014	Jacob Zuma	1 dead
Insurgency in Cabo Delgado (2017–present)	SADC; South Africa; Mozambique; Tanzania; Angola; Botswana; Rwanda; Malawi; Lesotho	Ansar al-Sunna; Islamic State of Iraq and the Levant	Ongoing: involvement of South African Special forces from July 2021	Cyril Ramaphosa	1

== See also ==
- 1981 Seychelles coup attempt
