= Luís Medina Barrón =

Mexican politician and general (1873–1937)

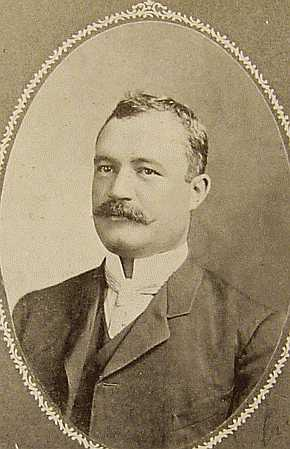

Governor of Zacatecas
- In office February 20, 1914 – 1914
- President: Victoriano Huerta
- Preceded by: José Guadalupe González
- Succeeded by: Trinidad Cervantez

Personal details
- Born: September 30, 1871 Jerez de García Salinas, Zacatecas, Mexico
- Died: April 27, 1937 (aged 65) Mexico City, Mexico

Military service
- Allegiance: Porfiriato; Federalists; Felicistas
- Branch: Federal Army
- Years of service: 1890 — 1920
- Rank: General
- Battles/wars: Yaqui Wars; Mexican Revolution: Battle of Zacatecas

Luís Medina Barrón was a Mexican General who was most notable for his participation in the Battle of Zacatecas during the Mexican Revolution.

== Biography ==
Barrón was born in Jerez de García Salinas, Zacatecas, on September 30, 1871, to Urbano Medina and Josefa Barrón. He began his military career at the age of 17 with the rank of second lieutenant in the infantry. For many years, he was active in the auxiliary forces of the state. He accompanied Governor Rafael Izábal during the Yaqui Wars and in all the expeditions he organized against the rebellious Indians. He was promoted to major and obtained the command of the 11th Rural Corps of the Federation.

With the beginning of the Mexican Revolution, he operated in the Sierra de Chihuahua, fighting in Batopilas and Agua Prieta and gaining promotion to lieutenant colonel. He later commanded the 8th Rural Corps. He fought the Zapatistas in Morelos in 1911 during the León de la Barra government. As a brigadier, he returned to Zacatecas in April 1913 with the command of a brigade of the Rural Corps, a new formation that had been created to fight the Constitutionalist Revolution and consisting of battalions 39 and 52, 400 Mexican volunteers, 150 volunteers from Xico, and 2 batteries. The Corps also attended the battles of Santa Rosa and Santa María in which the federalists were defeated. Barrón was promoted to Brigadier General.

On February 20, 1914 he was appointed governor of the state of Zacatecas, and that June he participated in the Battle of Zacatecas. After Pánfilo Natera was demoted, Barrón was promoted to divisionary general; however, he was defeated and evicted by the División del Norte of Pancho Villa. In a message to General Victoriano Huerta, he informed him of the defeat: "The Plaza de Zacatecas fell with blood and fire, annihilating the entire garrison."

Between 1917 and 1920 he fought against the Carrancistas, joining the Felicistas that operated in Veracruz. He seconded the Agua Prieta Plan and was promoted to General. He served several years in the Mexican consular service. He died on April 27, 1937 in Mexico City and was buried in the French Pantheon.
