= Proxy war =

Type of armed conflict between two states or non-state actors

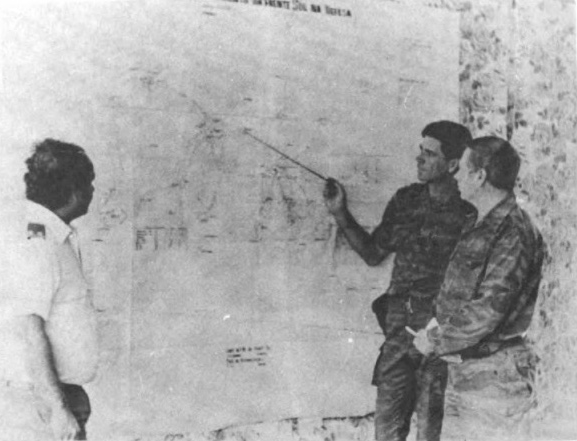
Soviet military advisers planning operations during the Angolan Civil War (1975–2002), a proxy conflict involving the USSR and United States

In political science, a proxy war is an armed conflict where at least one of the belligerents is directed or supported by an external third-party power. In the term proxy war, a belligerent with external support is the proxy; both belligerents in a proxy war can be considered proxies if both are receiving foreign military aid from a third-party country. Acting either as a nation-state government or as a conventional force, a proxy belligerent acts on behalf of a third-party state sponsor.

A proxy war is characterised by a direct, long-term, geopolitical relationship between the third-party sponsor states and their client states or non-state clients, thus the political sponsorship becomes military sponsorship when the third-party powers fund the soldiers and their materiel to equip the belligerent proxy-army to launch and fight and sustain a war to victory, and government power. However, the relationship between sponsors and proxies can be characterized by principal-agent problems whereby the sponsor may be unable to control the actions of the proxy. A proxy war also can be a civil war, as in the Korean War and the Vietnam War during the Cold War.

== History ==
During classical antiquity and the Middle Ages, many non-state proxies were external parties that were introduced into an internal conflict and aligned themselves with a belligerent to gain influence and to further their own interests in the region. Proxies could be introduced by an external or local power and most commonly took the form of irregular armies which were used to achieve their sponsor's goals in a contested region. Some medieval states like the Byzantine Empire used proxy warfare as a foreign-policy tool by deliberately cultivating intrigue among hostile rivals and then backing them when they went to war with each other. Other states regarded proxy wars as merely a useful extension of a pre-existing conflict, such as France and England during the Hundred Years' War, both of which initiated a longstanding practice of supporting privateers, which targeted the other's merchant shipping. France used England's turmoil of the Wars of the Roses from their victory as a proxy, siding with the Lancastrians against the Yorkists who were backed by the Burgundian State. The Ottoman Empire likewise used the Barbary pirates as proxies to harass Western European powers in the Mediterranean Sea.

Frequent application of the term "proxy war" indicates its prominent place in academic research on international relations. Distinct implementations of soft power and hard power have proved to be unsuccessful in recent years. Accordingly, great failures in classic wars increased the tendency to use proxy wars. Since the early twentieth century, proxy wars have most commonly taken the form of states assuming the role of sponsors to non-state proxies and essentially using them as fifth columns to undermine adversarial powers. That type of proxy warfare includes external support for a faction engaged in a civil war, terrorists, national-liberation movements, and insurgent groups, or assistance to a national revolt against foreign occupation. For example, the British government partially organized and instigated the Arab Revolt to undermine the Ottoman Empire during the First World War. Many proxy wars began assuming a distinctive ideological dimension after the Spanish Civil War, which pitted the fascist political ideology of Italy and Nazi Germany against the communist ideology of the Soviet Union without involving these states in open warfare with each other. Sponsors of both sides also used the Spanish conflict as a proving ground for their own weapons and battlefield tactics.

During the Cold War, proxy warfare was motivated by fears that an armed conflict between the United States and the Soviet Union by conventional warfare would result in nuclear holocaust, which rendered the use of ideological proxies a safer way to conduct hostilities. The Soviet government found that supporting parties antagonistic to the U.S. and other Western nations was a cost-effective way to combat NATO's influence compared to direct military engagement. Additionally, the proliferation of televised media and its impact on public perception made the U.S. public especially susceptible to war-weariness and being skeptical of risking life abroad. That encouraged the American practice of arming insurgent forces, such as the funnelling of supplies to the mujahideen during the Soviet–Afghan War. Other examples of proxy war include the Korean War and the Vietnam War.

== Abstract ==
The governments of some nations, particularly liberal democracies, may choose to engage in proxy warfare (despite their military superiority) if most of their citizens oppose declaring or entering a conventional war. That featured prominently in US strategy following the Vietnam War because of the so-called "Vietnam Syndrome" of extreme war weariness among the American population. That was also a significant factor in motivating the US to enter conflicts such as the Syrian Civil War by proxy actors after a series of costly drawn-out direct engagements in the Middle East spurred a recurrence of war weariness, the "war on terror syndrome".

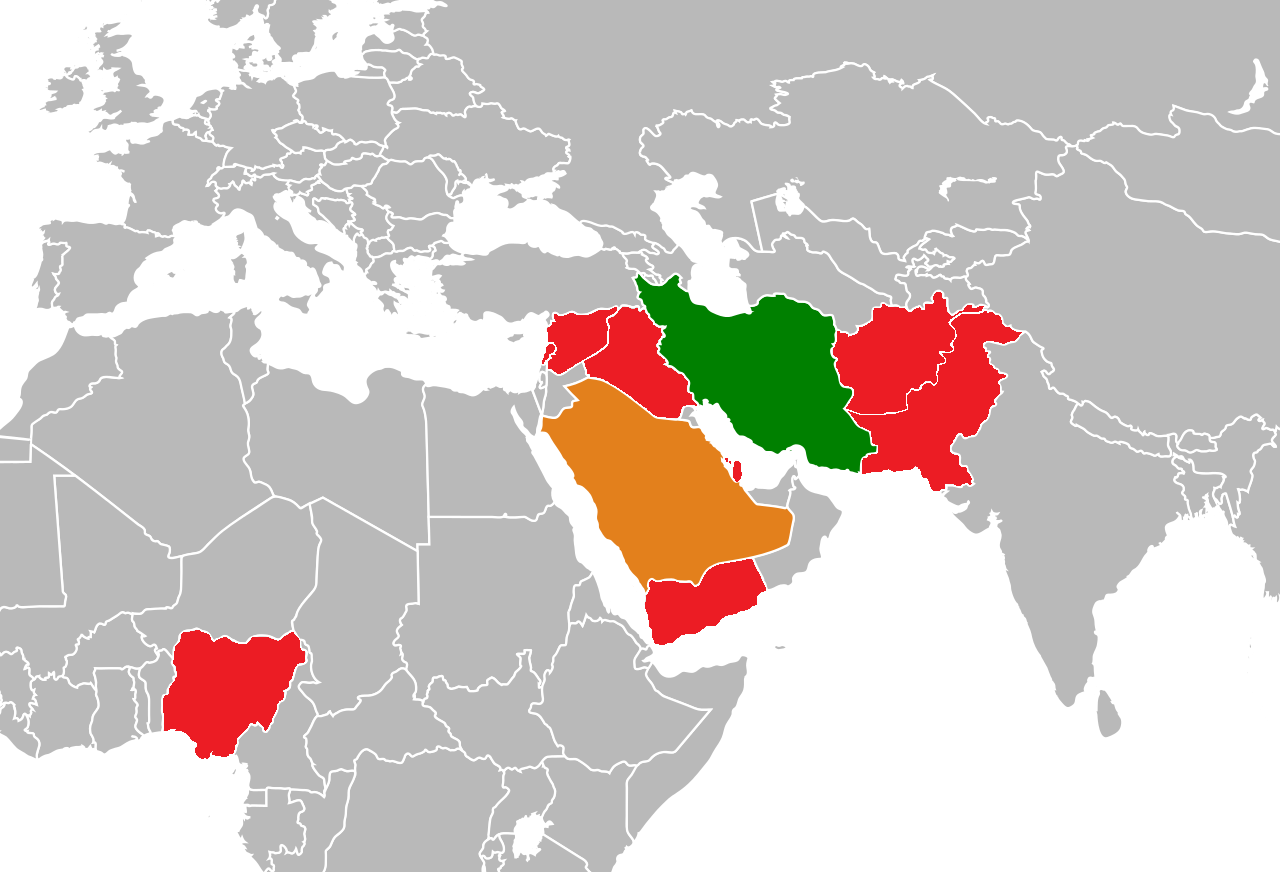
Major Iran–Saudi Arabia proxy conflict locations

In some cases, nations may be motivated to engage in proxy warfare because of financial concerns: supporting irregular troops, insurgents, non-state actors, or less-advanced allied militaries (often with obsolete or surplus equipment) can be significantly cheaper than deploying national armed forces, and the proxies usually bear the brunt of casualties and economic damage resulting from prolonged conflict.

Another common motivating factor is the existence of a security dilemma. A nation may use military intervention to install a more favorable government in a third-party state. Rival nations may perceive the intervention as a weakened position to their own security and may respond by attempting to undermine such efforts, often by backing parties favorable to their own interests (such as those directly or indirectly under their control, sympathetic to their cause, or ideologically aligned). In that case, if one or both rivals come to believe that their favored faction is at a disadvantage, they will often respond by escalating military and/or financial support. If their counterpart(s), perceiving a material threat or desiring to avoid the appearance of weakness or defeat, follow suit, a proxy war ensues between the two powers. That was a major factor in many of the proxy wars during the Cold War between the United States and the Soviet Union, as well as in the ongoing series of conflicts between Saudi Arabia and Iran, especially in Yemen and Syria.

== Effects ==
Proxy wars can have a huge impact, especially on the local area. A proxy war with significant effects occurred between the United States and the Soviet Union during the Vietnam War. Operation Rolling Thunder, a U.S. bombing campaign in North Vietnam destroyed significant amounts of infrastructure. Many bombs were also dropped on North Vietnamese supply routes in Cambodia and Laos. Equally, if not more, significant was the Soviet–Afghan War, which saw the U.S. fund the Afghan mujahideen against the invading Soviet forces (see Operation Cyclone). This war cost hundreds of thousands of lives and billions of dollars, bankrupting the Soviet Union and contributing to its collapse.

The conflict in the Middle East between Saudi Arabia and Iran is another example of the destructive impact of proxy wars. Since 2003, nearly 500,000 have died in the Iraqi conflict. Since 2011, more than 500,000 have died in the Syrian Civil War. Over 377,000 people had died in the Yemeni Civil War by early 2022. In the war in Afghanistan, more than 176,000 were killed between 2001 and 2021. In Pakistan, more than 57,000 have been killed since 2003.

In general, lengths, intensities, and scales of armed conflicts are often greatly increased if belligerents' capabilities are augmented by external support. Belligerents are often less likely to engage in diplomatic negotiations, peace talks are less likely to bear fruit, and damage to infrastructure can be many times greater.

== See also ==
- Arsenal of Democracy
- China–North Korea relations
- Grey-zone (international relations)
- Historic recurrence
- Hybrid warfare
- Iran–Israel proxy conflict
- List of proxy wars
- Russia–United States relations
