= Battle of Zacatecas (1914) =

Battle of the Mexican Revolution

- Part of the Mexican Revolution
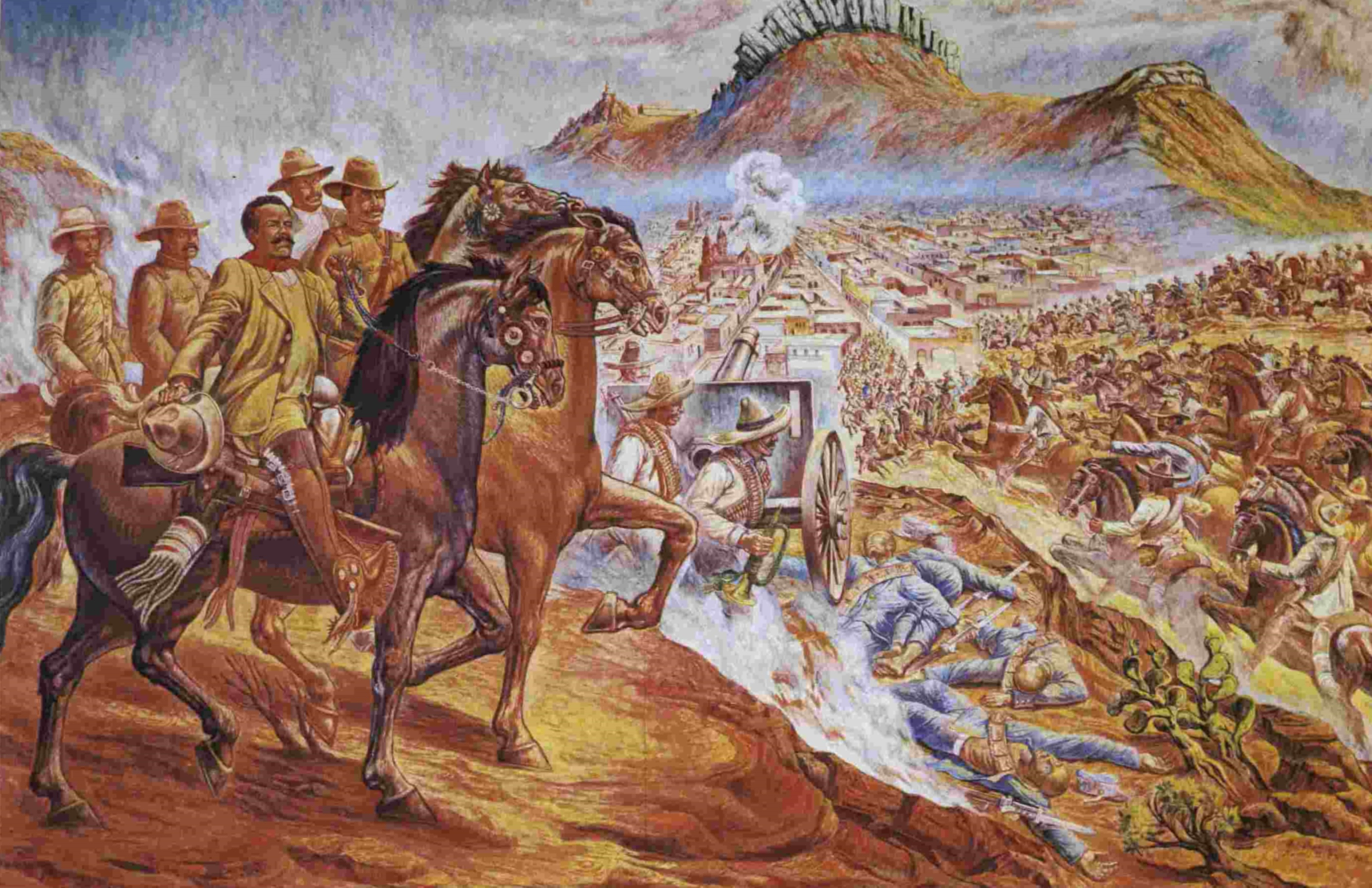
Date	23 June 1914
Location	Zacatecas, Zacatecas
Result	Decisive Rebel victory: Revolutionary forces advance to Mexico City; President Victoriano Huerta resigns; Venustiano Carranza becomes president

Belligerents
Constitutionalists: División del Norte	Government: Federal Army

Commanders and leaders
Pancho Villa	General Luís Medina Barrón

Strength
Over 20,000 (estimate)	7,000–15,000 (most likely 12,000)

Casualties and losses
1,200 – 3,000 (estimate)	9,000; 6,000 killed, 3,000 captured (estimate)

The Battle of Zacatecas, also known as the Toma de Zacatecas ("Taking of Zacatecas"), was the bloodiest battle in the campaign to overthrow Mexican President Victoriano Huerta. On June 23, 1914, Pancho Villa's División del Norte (Division of the North) decisively defeated the federal troops of General Luis Medina Barrón defending the town of Zacatecas. The great victory demoralized Huerta's supporters, leading to his resignation on July 15. However, the Toma de Zacatecas also marked the end of support of Villa's Division of the North from Constitutionalist leader Venustiano Carranza and US President Woodrow Wilson.

== Background ==
Zacatecas, a silver-mining town of 30,000 inhabitants, possessed a strategic military asset: a railroad junction that had to be captured in order to advance from the north on the capital, Mexico City. General Rubio Navarrete planned to use the mountain strongholds surrounding the city to weaken or destroy the División del Norte. Huerta sent one of his better officers, General Medina Barrón, with reinforcements for the federal troops already defending the town. Estimates of the size of his total force range from 7,000 to 15,000, but it is likely he had 12,000 men.

By 1914, the federal army under Huerta had been greatly increased in size from those of Porfirio Díaz and Francisco Madero. However, the rank-and-file conscripts, often randomly press-ganged, were poorly motivated and prone to desertion. In contrast, Villa's División del Norte was comparatively well organized, employed trained federal defectors in key roles, and included effective artillery and mounted units.

As Huerta's defeat became more certain, the divide between Pancho Villa and Venustiano Carranza also increased. Villa began to act independently of Carranza: for example, he refused to have his division subordinated to Obregón and killing British citizen Robert Benton, which sparked the Benton affair. Combined with his recent victories overshadowing other Constitutionalist generals, Carranza grew distrustful of Villa and saw him as a potential rival in the control over Mexico. Therefore, to help prevent Villa from reaching Mexico City first, he ordered him to attack Saltillo after his hard-fought victory at Torreón. Carranza instead chose General Pánfilo Natera for the assault on Zacatecas. After receiving federal reinforcements on June 14, 1914, Medina Barrón easily repulsed Natera's attack. During this two-day initial battle for Zacatecas Villa had refused on various pretexts to send artillery and other support called for by Natera.

Carranza faced a dilemma. Villa commanded the only force with the ability to penetrate the stronghold at Zacatecas; however, he still sought to prevent Villa from marching on Mexico City, or even from occupying Zacatecas. Carranza ordered that a detachment of 5,000 men from Villa's army be placed under the command of Natera for the next attack on Zacatecas. Villa had been eager to placate Carranza in earlier negotiations with the Constitutionalist leader and complied with his orders to seize the city of Saltillo, even over the objections of Villa's trusted advisors, Felipe Ángeles, José María Maytorena, and Roque González Garza. After Carranza's detachment proposal, however, Villa concluded that a reconciliation was unlikely. So Villa planned an attack on Zacatecas in defiance of orders from the First Chief of the Constitutionalist government.

== Battle ==
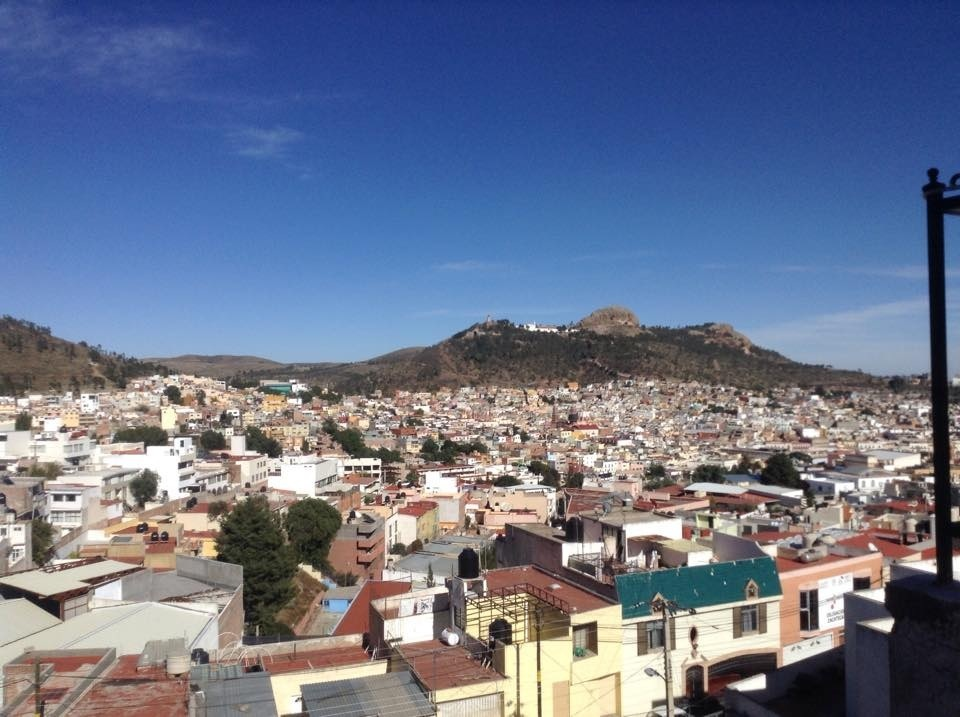
Cerro de la Bufa

Zacatecas is ringed by high hills. Medina Barrón placed many of his best troops on two of them, La Bufa and El Grillo, with two batteries of artillery in support, while also fortifying the two smaller hills, Loreto and La Sierpe. Villa assigned the planning of the attack to General Felipe Ángeles, a professional soldier and artillery specialist. Ángeles decided to take advantage of the greater numbers and superior artillery of the rebel forces and storm the town from all sides, with the artillery concentrating on La Bufa and El Grillo. Medina Barrón positioned himself at La Bufa to oversee its defense.

On June 20, 1914, a federal relief detachment of about two thousand men reached Zacatecas although two further columns of reinforcements from the south were unable to bypass blocking Constitututionalist forces. Even with this addition the garrison of Zacatecas was outnumbered, by roughly two to one, by the encircling Division of the North.

The bombardment started at 10 a.m. on June 23. Villa led multiple cavalry charges against the stronghold on El Grillo, while Ángeles directed his twenty-nine field and mountain artillery pieces at both hills. Villa captured El Grillo at 1 p.m. General Medina Barrón and his men retreated into the town from El Grillo. La Bufa suffered the same fate late in the afternoon, with the remaining federal troops evacuating to the Plaza de Armas. Villa later reported that he and Ángeles narrowly escaped when a shell in a nearby artillery piece exploded, killing or wounding all of its crew.

With the loss of the northern heights, Zacatecas itself was exposed on all sides to artillery and rifle fire. Panic set in, as the defenders expected that Villa's men would show no mercy. According to James Caldwell, the British consul stationed in Zacatecas, the morale of the troops, who had fought bravely until this point, suddenly collapsed and the streets became chaotic. Many soldiers hid, discarded their uniforms and abandoned their gear, ridding themselves of any visible association with the federal army. Medina Barrón ordered a retreat to the neighboring town of Guadalupe, on the road to the city of Aguascalientes, from which reinforcements were expected. However, the retreating column of about 1,500 federal soldiers found 7,000 fresh rebel troops blocking their way. Most of the disorganised federals were slaughtered by Constitutionalist riflemen firing from the slopes on either side of the road. The surviving federal troops still attempted to escape the city, though others returned amid continuing street fighting. The greatest single act of destruction in the city occurred when a lieutenant colonel defending the federal headquarters blew up the ammunition stores to avoid surrender. The explosion destroyed an entire block in the heart of Zacatecas, killing hundreds.

== Aftermath ==
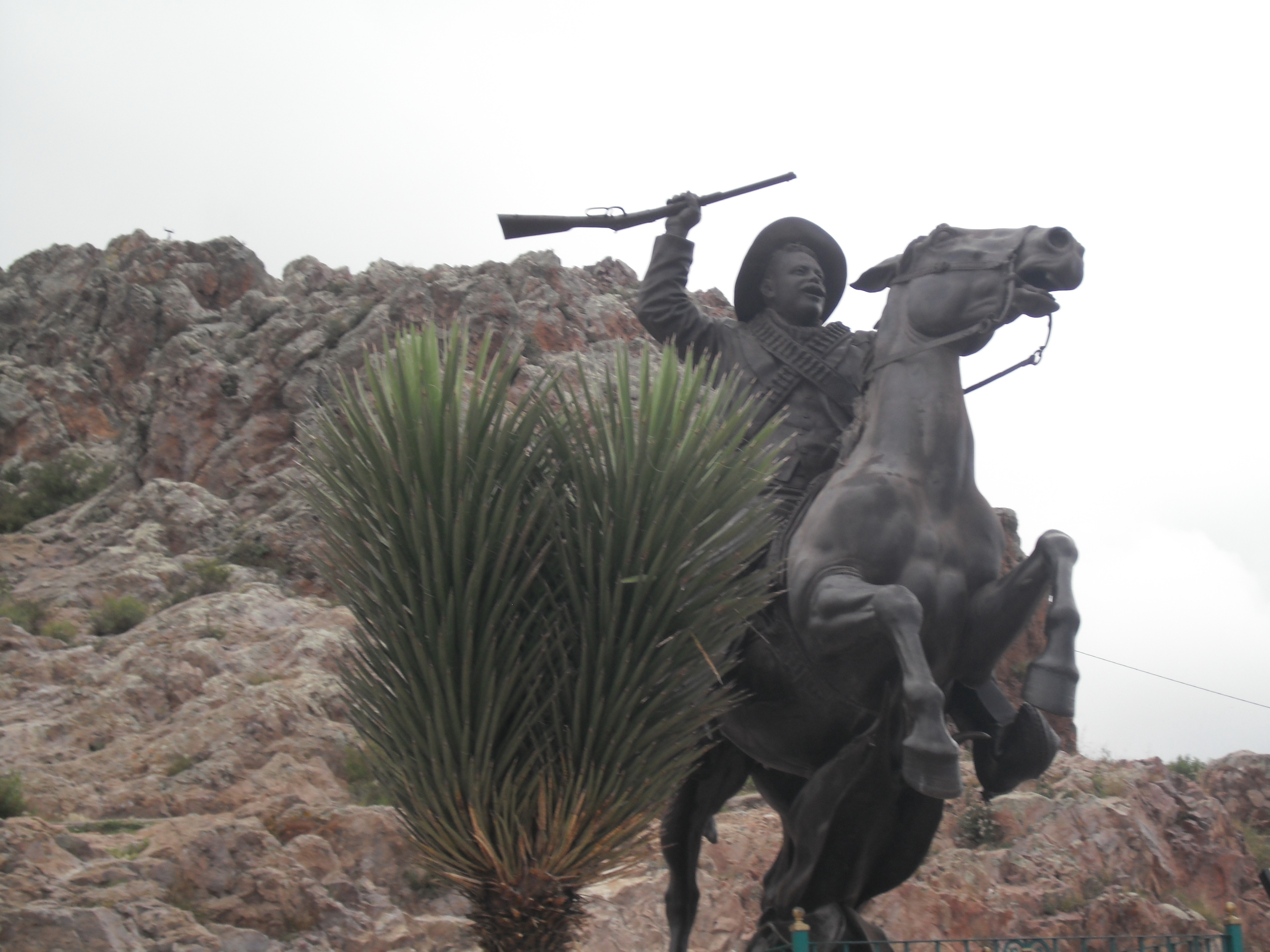
Equestrian statue of Pancho Villa, atop Cerro de la Bufa

Federal officers taken prisoner were executed, as were Colorado irregulars (supporters of Pascual Orozco, regarded as traitors by Villa). In one incident shortly after the fall of Zacatecas, involving about 500 prisoners, all federal captives of the rank of corporal and above were lined up and shot. The killing of prisoners continued until former federal officer General Felipe Ángeles arrived at dusk and ordered the executions to cease. Ángeles also ordered the incineration of the numerous civilian and military corpses littering the streets, to prevent the outbreak of disease.

In total, an estimated 6,000–7,000 defenders were killed, many of the rest were wounded, and only Medina Barrón and a few hundred men reached the safety of Aguascalientes. About 700 of Villa's men were killed and 1,500 wounded.

Discord between Villa and Carranza continued, with the latter refusing to supply coal for trains under the control of the Division of the North. Villa's forces were accordingly unable to move south from Zacatecas and it was the Army Corps of the Northwest, commanded by Álvaro Obregón, that led the advance on Mexico City. In addition to losing support from Carranza, Villa lost his supply of arms from the north. US President Woodrow Wilson, who had previously lifted an arms embargo on Mexico in favor of Villa and the Division of the North, reimposed the embargo. Then, after a short time, he relaxed the general embargo, but still prohibited arms shipments to Villa-controlled territory. Isolated by Carranza and the new Wilson policy, Villa retreated to the north.

The defeat at Zacatecas marked the end of the old federal army as an effective institution. Huerta fled into exile on July 15, 1914. The remaining federal commanders ordered the disbandment of the regular army and the rurales (mounted police) in August, following abortive efforts to negotiate a merger with revolutionary factions. Instead, the federal commanders entered into the Teoloyucan Treaties, in which they agreed to cease opposition to Obregón's forces and to assist them in protecting Mexico City from the approaching Zapatistas. Thus Obregón marched into Mexico City unopposed on August 14.

== Legacy ==
In 2014, the Bank of Mexico issued a twenty-peso coin commemorating the centenary of the battle.

== Bibliography ==
- Atkin, Ronald (1972). Revolution! Mexico 1910–20. London: Granada Publishing, Ltd. OCLC 1097206134.
- Jowett, P.; Quesada, A. (2006). The Mexican Revolution 1910–20. Botley, Oxford, United Kingdom: Osprey Publishing. ISBN 1-84176-989-4.
- Katz, Friedrich (1998). The Life and Times of Pancho Villa. Stanford, California: Stanford University Press. ISBN 0-8047-3046-6.
- Knight, Alan (1986). The Mexican Revolution, Volume 2: Counter-revolution and Reconstruction. Cambridge: Cambridge University Press. ISBN 1-84176-989-4.
