= East Turkistan Education and Solidarity Association =

Uyghur organisation based in Turkey

- شەرقىي تۈركىستان مائارىپ ۋە ھەمكارلىق جەمئىيىتى
- Abbreviation: ETESA
- Formation: 2006
- Type: Religious organisation
- Headquarters: Istanbul
- Location: Turkey
- Official languages: English; Turkish; Uyghur; Arabic
- Website: maarip.org

The East Turkistan Education and Solidarity Association (ETESA; Uyghur: شەرقىي تۈركىستان مائارىپ ۋە ھەمكارلىق جەمئىيىتى, romanized: Sherqiy Türkistan Maarip ve Hemkarliq Jemiyiti) is a Uyghur Islamist organisation based in Istanbul, Turkey.

The government of China has accused the group of having ties to the Turkistan Islamic Party (formerly known as the East Turkestan Islamic Movement or ETIM), a claim it denies.

== Purpose ==
The ETESA states that their purpose is to "educate and bring up Turkistani (Turkic) Muslims" by "meeting their Islamic, social, cultural, spiritual and earthly needs".

== See also ==
- East Turkestan independence movement
- Xinjiang conflict
