= Bernard Semmel =

American historian (1928–2008)

- Born: July 23, 1928; New York City, U.S.
- Died: August 18, 2008 (aged 80)
- Education: City College of New York (BA); Columbia University (PhD)
- Occupation: Historian

Bernard Semmel (July 23, 1928 – August 18, 2008) was an American historian specialising in British imperial history.

== Life ==
Bernard Semmel was born in the Bronx, and attended New York City public schools. He received his B.A. from the College of the City of New York in 1947, and his Ph.D. from Columbia University in 1955. His first academic position was at Park College in 1956; he visited the London School of Economics in 1959–60, working with Lionel Robbins. He taught at the State University of New York at Stony Brook from 1960 until 1990, when he was appointed Distinguished Professor in the History department at the CUNY Graduate Center. He retired in 1996.

== Works ==
- Imperialism and Social Reform: English Social-Imperial Thought, 1895–1914 (1960).
- Jamaican Blood and Victorian Conscience: The Governor Eyre Controversy (1962). Alternative titles: "The Governor Eyre Controversy" (UK edition); "Democracy vs. Empire" (Anchor Doubleday paperback edition).
- Occasional Papers of T. R. Malthus (edited with an introduction, 1963).
- The Rise of Free Trade Imperialism: Classical Political Economy, the Empire of Free Trade and Imperialism, 1750–1850 (1970).
- Élie Halévy, The Birth of Methodism (translated and with an introduction by Semmel, 1971).
- The Methodist Revolution (1973).
- Marxism and the Science of War (1981).
- John Stuart Mill and the Pursuit of Virtue (1984).
- Liberalism and Naval Strategy: Ideology, Interest and Sea Power during the Pax Britannica (1986).
- The Liberal Ideal and the Demons of Empire: Theories of Imperialism from Adam Smith to Lenin (1993).
- George Eliot and the Politics of National Inheritance (1994).
