= Operation Flotilla =

- Part of the Rhodesian Bush War
Date	20 May – 13 July 1968
Location	Nyamapanda, Rhodesia; Tete Province, Mozambique, Portugal 22.848084°S 31.960901°E
Result	Rhodesian-Portuguese victory

Belligerents
Portugal; Rhodesia	ZANLA

Commanders and leaders
(Portugal) Unknown (Rhodesia) Maj. Peter Rich	Unknown

Units involved
(Portugal) Forças Armadas: Portuguese Army; Rhodesian Army: RLI; 1 Commando	Unknown

Strength
Unknown	17

Casualties and losses
Portugal: 3 killed 2 wounded Rhodesia: None	ZANLA: 3 killed 9 captured

Operation Flotilla was a military operation launched by the Rhodesian Army working with the Portuguese Army in Mozambique in response to the threat posed to Rhodesia by a group of 17 Lusaka-based nationalists who had the intent of entering Rhodesia through its border with Mozambique.

== Background ==
Covert coordinated efforts between the Rhodesian and Portuguese Armed Forces had started in 1967, and soon after Cauldron ended, the RLI was involved in a joint operation in Mozambique. A group of 17 Lusaka-based nationalists infiltrated Mozambique's north-western Tete Province, between Rhodesia and Malawi, in April 1968. Their presence was reported to Portuguese authorities on 20 May by local tribesmen from Catumbula, a small village just north of the Mazoe River, which in that area ran along the border with Rhodesia. A Portuguese patrol contacted and scattered the guerrillas the next day. The nationalist fighters, split into two groups, then moved towards Rhodesia, one team heading south-west.

== Operation ==
Acting on information given by the Portuguese, the Rhodesians started Operation Flotilla, based at the border town of Nyamapanda, on 23 May. 1 Commando, RLI was sent out on patrol the same day under Major Peter Rich. However, no trace of the insurgents was reported by Rich's men, apart from the tracks of six men on the northern (Mozambican) side of the Mazoe River. The cadres had not actually left Mozambique; a counter-insurgency effort by the Portuguese army and police then soon followed. The result was the arrest of two insurgents, on 30 May and 2 June, and the killing of three insurgents by the Portuguese on 8 June. On 27 June the remaining insurgents ambushed the Portuguese army near Dombé, killing three Portuguese soldiers and wounding two. The Portuguese managed to capture one more near the Rhodesian border. The insurgents then split up into two groups, with five insurgents remaining in Mozambique while the other six crossed into Rhodesia.

=== Aftermath ===
The six who did cross into Rhodesia were eventually arrested by the BSAP in late July.
