= Operation Birch =

- Part of the Rhodesian Bush War (or Second Chimurenga)
- Operation Birch (Zimbabwe)
Date	18 January – 23 March 1970
Location	Mashonaland, Rhodesia
Result	Rhodesian-Portuguese victory

Belligerents
Rhodesia; Portugal	ZIPRA

Commanders and leaders
(Rhodesia) Maj. Peter Rich (Portugal) Unknown	James Chikerema; Phinias Majuru (surrendered)

Units involved
Rhodesian Army; RLI; 1 Commando; 3 Commando; (Portugal) Portuguese Army	Unknown

Strength
Unknown	22–25

Casualties and losses
Rhodesia: 1 killed 2 wounded Portugal: unknown	7 killed 2 wounded 13 captured 1 defected Total: 23

Operation Birch was an operation launched by the Rhodesian Security Forces in response to a group of 22–25 ZIPRA insurgents crossing the Zambezi River, which marked the border between Rhodesia and Zambia, in January 1970.

== Background ==
ZAPU's vice-president, James Chikerema, planned another infiltration from Zambia during the final months of 1969, intending to send 25 of ZIPRA's best fighters across the Zambezi and then on to four separate destinations, split into four "gangs": Gang 1 would make for Melsetter in the south-east of the country, Gang 2 would head for Umtali on the Rhodesia–Mozambique border, and Gangs 3 and 4 would go to the north-eastern towns of Mtoko and Mount Darwin respectively. Three of the 25 refused to operate in Mashonaland, saying that they would only fight for ZIPRA in Matabeleland. Five cadres scouted ahead of the main group from 11 to 14 December 1969, identifying a safe crossing point and inspecting the route to be taken by the main infiltration squad. The rest of the 22 insurgents crossed during the nights of 30 and 31 December. The ZIPRA CTs (Communist Terrorists) then made their way south and on 17 January 1970 split up at the foot of the Zambezi escarpment, about 8 kilometres (5 mi) west of the Hunyani River. They were detected the following day when two of the five cadres from Gang 1 revealed themselves to a guard manning a fly-gate at Tondongwe in the Doma Safari Area. After selling some food to the guerrillas, the guard reported the incident and Operation Birch was initiated.

== The Operation ==
The security forces set up a JOC at Mangula at 09:30 on 19 January with 1 Commando present. A tracking team led by Lieutenant Nigel Henson first made contact around noon on 21 January, when concealed ZIPRA cadres from Gang 2 fired upon them with an RPD machine-gun and AK-47 and SKS rifles. Henson's men withdrew and 1 Commando set up stop points around the contact area to contain the guerrillas during the day; night-ambush positions were then set up as darkness fell. The RLI moved up again at dawn the next day and met the insurgents at 07:30, when a stick of five 1 Commando men led by Lieutenant Bruce Snelgar was sighted in an area of thick bush by three guerrillas from Gang 2. The cadres caught Snelgar's stick by surprise, opening fire with a heavy burst of RPD bullets. Snelgar and Trooper McMaster were wounded and Trooper Anthony Brading was shot dead. In the battle which ensued all three ZIPRA fighters were killed with no further loss to the RLI.

Over the next few days PATU and RLI patrols arrested five insurgents, two of whom were deserters. One of these defected and agreed to guide the security forces to the ZIPRA base camp, where he said there were two guerrillas waiting for him to return, unaware of his desertion and subsequent defection. Shown the way by the ex-cadre an RLI patrol attacked the camp on 24 January and killed one of the two; the other fled and was captured a few days later. The members of Gang 1 were now all killed or captured while only one was outstanding from Gang 2. Gangs 3 and 4 were revealed to be near Sipolilo on 21 January by a black shopkeeper, and two Gang 3 members were encountered by Henson's troop on 24 January. Henson himself opened fire and killed one, who it emerged was the Gang 3 commander. His troop then followed about 10 terrorists until 26 January, when they lost the insurgents' tracks.

RLI patrols were intensified further over the following days, with 3 Commando being brought in to assist around Sipolilo. 13 Troop, 3 Commando, under Sergeant Phil Raath, encountered the 10 terrorists at a kraal near Bakasa, north of Sipolilo, on 31 January, and killed one; the other nine fled. Later that day a patrol led by Corporal Dennis Croukamp captured Phinias Majuru, the ZIPRA Director of Operations. "It was only a week later after the patrol was over that we learnt who it was we had captured," Croukamp writes. "It was Joshua Nkomo's Chief of Operations. The equivalent of a very senior staff officer, he was in the country trying to determine why ZIPRA was being so unsuccessful and he was on his way back with recommendations, clipboard and all." The remaining ZIPRA fighters scattered and escaped the area over the following week, the Rhodesian Security Forces losing track of each one. On 9 February 1970 local security force presence was reduced to police, one helicopter and one RLI Commando. A member of Gang 3 was arrested by the Portuguese in Mozambique the next day, but without further developments over the next month, Operation Birch shut down on 5 March 1970.

== Aftermath ==
Two more members of Gang 4 were detained by police in Mukumbura township on 21 March, and three days later the Portuguese killed one and captured another. The final account for Operation Birch, which had countered the last ZIPRA incursion for six years, was seven cadres killed, thirteen captured and two outstanding. "From 1970 onward, ZAPU played no part in the terrorist war," writes Lieutenant-Colonel R. E. H. Lockley. "They were in a state of disarray following their decisive defeats within Rhodesia, so they took the opportunity of consolidating their position by sending their terrorists outside the country on extended courses to Russia, Cuba and North Korea. This situation with ZAPU continued until 1976. ... There were no incursions in 1970 worthy of note."
