= Felicistas =

Felicistas were the supporters of Félix Díaz, nephew of former president Porfirio Díaz, who opposed the Francisco I. Madero and Venustiano Carranza governments in Mexican rebellions between 1912 and 1920.

== See also ==
- List of factions in the Mexican Revolution
