= Henry Crabb =

Henry Crabb may refer to:

- Henry A. Crabb (died 1857), American soldier and politician in California
- Henry Walker Crabb (1828–1899), American wine cultivator
- Henry Crabb (judge) (1793–1827), Justice of the Tennessee Supreme Court
