= Crabb massacre =

Culmination of the eight day Battle of Caborca

Crabb Massacre
- Part of the Reform War
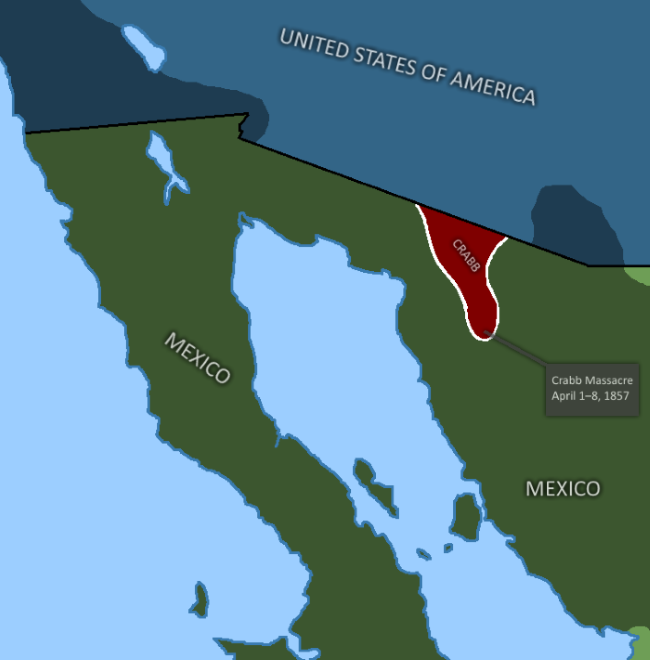
- Map Showing the location of the Crabb Massacre
Date	April 1–8, 1857
Location	Caborca, Sonora, Mexico
Result	Mexican victory

Belligerents
United States	Mexico; Tohono O'odham

Commanders and leaders
Henry A. Crabb (executed)	Ignacio Pesqueira; Hilario Gabilonda

Strength
~100	1,200

Casualties and losses
87 killed	189 killed or wounded

The Crabb Massacre was the culmination of the eight-day Battle of Caborca. It was fought between Mexico and their O'odham allies against irregular forces from the United States in April 1857. Due to the outbreak of the Reform War in Mexico between conservatives and liberals (1858–1860), the rebel Ignacio Pesqueira invited the U.S. politician Henry A. Crabb to colonize the northern frontier region in the state of Sonora. The colonists could help Pesqueira fight in the civil war and against the Apache.

The idea of an American intervention was unpopular among Pesqueira's supporters, and when Crabb arrived in Mexico, his command was attacked and defeated by Pesqueira's liberal forces. About 50 of the 85 men survived the battle only to be executed by the Mexicans, including Crabb himself.

== Background ==
The Reform War was a Mexican civil war, between Mexico's rival conservative and liberal factions. Ignacio Pesqueira fought for the liberals in Sonora, against the state soldiers of the conservative Governor Manuel María Gándara. Henry A. Crabb was the son of a judge from Nashville, Tennessee, a former State Senator from California, and a former United States Army officer, but his journey to Mexico in 1857, known as the Crabb Expedition, was of a private nature and was not directed by the United States government or its military. In the fall of 1856, after Crabb's loss in an election to decide the next senator of California, he came into contact with Pesqueira through his Mexican wife.

Crabb accepted Pesqueira's offer which authorized the general to bring 1,000 colonists to Sonora. By the time the expedition left for Mexico, the general had recruited only about 100 men. Other volunteers organized to follow Crabb into Sonora either abandoned the march or were attacked by the Mexicans. Starting out from San Diego, California in January 1857, the expedition went to the Lower Colorado River and then entered New Mexico Territory, now Arizona, and headed directly for the Gila River where they gathered livestock for several weeks. The location of the camp is now known as the Filibusters Camp. In March, they went south for the Tucson area to recruit more men. From Tucson, the expedition continued further south to Altar, Sonora, where they met with Pesqueira and his rebels. By the time Crabb reached Sonora, the liberals had already defeated Gándara's conservative troops and forced him into exile. Gándara later sought refuge in Tucson.

== Conflict ==
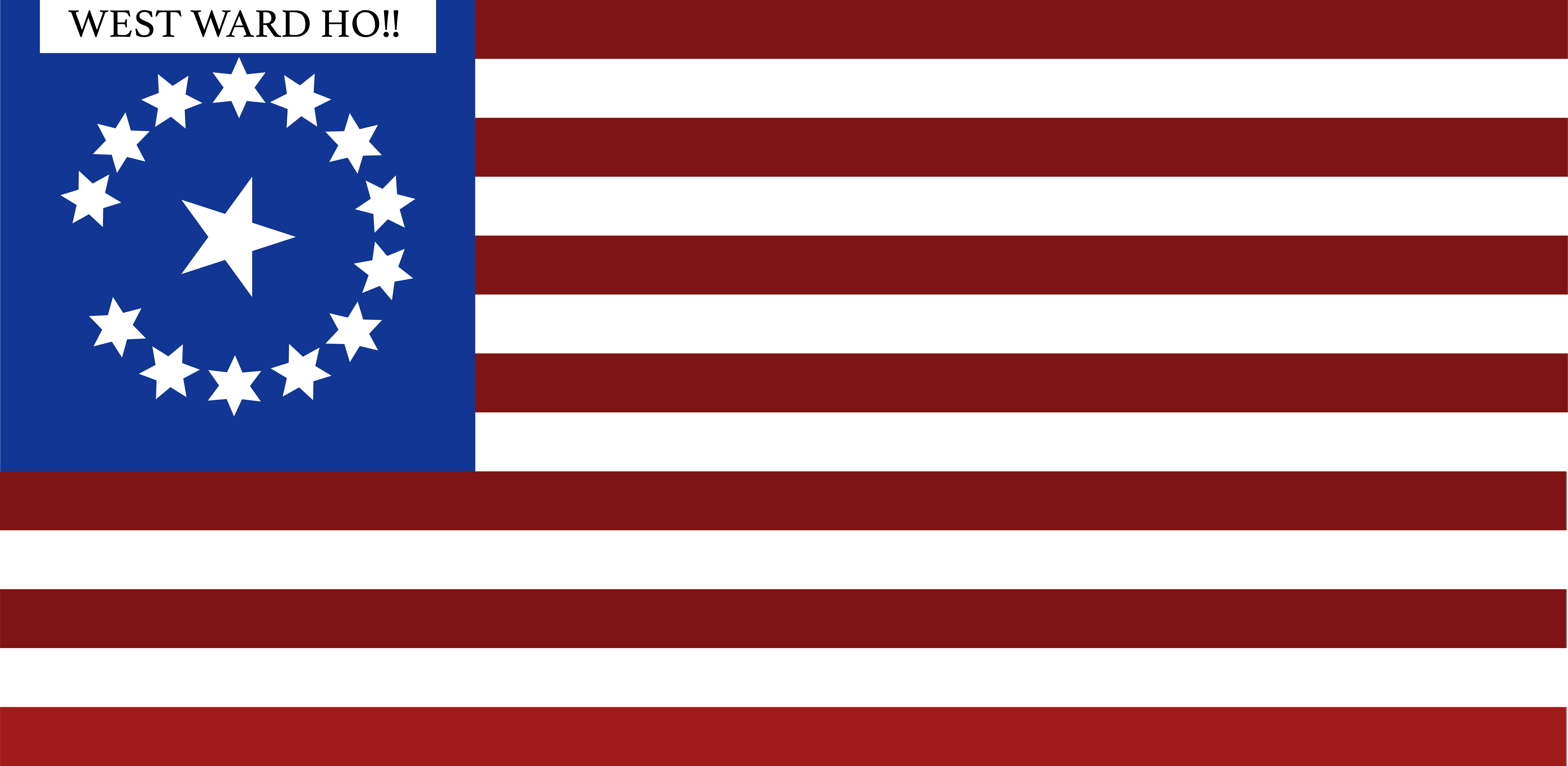
Flag used by the Crabb's expedition

Digital reconstruction of the Mexican flag flown by the liberals during the battle

The Crabb expedition first made contact with the rebels at Caborca, having diverged from Altar, their original destination. Now that he no longer needed the colonists from the U.S., Pesqueira was criticized by his followers for accepting American aid in the war. Because of this, the liberals decided to destroy the expedition. Crabb sent the prefect of Altar a message saying that he had come in peace but the message was either ignored or failed to arrive in time to influence the situation. At Caborca, the Americans became involved in a skirmish that took eight days to finish according to George N. Cardwell who wrote an account of the affair in a letter to his brother J. W. Cardwell.

== Massacre ==
Crabb's men took up positions inside an adobe building but it was later set on fire by an O'odham warrior, forcing their surrender. George Cardwell, an associate of some of the expedition's members, wrote that at the conclusion of the battle, 25 U.S. citizens had been killed and the remaining 58 were separated into groups of ten and executed by firing squad. Cardwell's letter says that 87 Americans were killed in all, including General Crabb, though other accounts say 77 Americans were killed in the massacre itself, not including those who died during the fighting. He includes a list of 55 of the Americans who died and says that among them were California's most respectable citizens. Cardwell wrote that the Mexicans lost 189 men out of about 1,200. This number included dozens of O'odham.

The Mexican commander, Hilario Gabilondo, who had received instructions from Pesqueira to shoot the prisoners, refused to carry out his orders and left with a fourteen-year-old American boy named Evans. Evans was raised by Gabilondo and later became a Mexican customs inspector at the international border with the United States.

General Crabb was allowed to write a letter to his wife before being executed by a firing squad of 100 men. After his execution, his head was cut off and preserved in a jar. The letter was given to one of two men who left the expedition before it crossed the international border between Arizona and Sonora. At the time, the Crabb Expedition was regarded by many Mexicans and Americans as being an outfit of filibusters organized to conquer Mexican territory, despite being sanctioned by the liberal government in Mexico which eventually won the Reform War in 1861. Cardwell himself wrote that "Mr. Crabb left here about January last, ostensibly for the purpose of mining in the Gadsden purchase, and settling there; but really intending to conquer Sonora, and in process of time add it to the slave states."

== Aftermath ==
The conflict was not over. Cardwell writes that "some days" after the Caborca affair, a group of 20 Mexicans crossed the border, from San Juan, into Arizona and captured four men of Crabb's party who were resting in a general store due to illness. These four were also executed. Shortly thereafter, twenty of Crabb's volunteers launched an expedition to relieve General Crabb. Led by Major R. N. Wood and Captain Granville Henderson Oury of Tucson, the rescue party was on the Mexican side of the border when about 200 Mexicans attacked them near the location where the four sickly men had been captured. After "severe fighting", these twenty recruits successfully made it back across the border. A squad of sixteen other recruits was not so fortunate, and after crossing the border were intercepted by the same 200 men who had encountered Major Wood and Captain Oury. These men (among whom was Freeman McKinney, the San Jose law partner of the notorious Parker H. French) surrendered without a fight, but were executed like the others.

Of the Americans who participated in the Battle of Caborca, only one or two men survived, including the fourteen-year-old Evans. Accounts differ as to the existence of a second survivor. In California and New Mexico Territory, news of the massacre created a clamor for revenge against the Mexicans but the incident was eventually put aside and forgotten. Sometime later, Gabilondo, who had refused to kill the American colonists, was nearly lynched in Tucson by an angry mob, but survived apparently because of his innocence.

== See also ==
- Goliad massacre
- Dawson massacre
- Mier expedition
- Republic of Sonora
- William Walker (filibuster)
- Capture of Tucson (1846)
- Crawford Affair
- Parker H. French
