= Mírame =

Mírame (English: "Look at me") may refer to:

- "Mírame" (Blessd and Ovy on the Drums song), 2024
- Mírame, 1997 album by Ana Belén
- Mírame, 2007 album by Marbella Corella
- Mírame, 1987 album by María Conchita Alonso
- Mírame, 2001 album by Manuel Landeta
- "Mírame", 2005 song by Belanova from the album Dulce Beat
- "Mírame", 2005 song by Daddy Yankee and Deevani from the album Mas Flow 2
- "Mírame", 2007 song by Alejandra Guzmán from Fuerza
- "Mírame", 2007 song by Jenni Rivera from the album Mi Vida Loca
- "Mírame", 2006 song by Mary Ann Avecedo from the album Mary Ann
- "Mírame", 2006 song by Nikki Clan
- "Mírame", 2009 song by Víctor Manuelle
- "Mírame (Cuestión de Tiempo)", 1987 song by Timbiriche from the album Timbiriche VII
