= Ignacio Pesqueira =

Mexican general and Governor of Sonora (1822–1865)

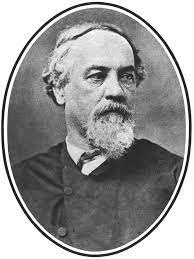

Governor of Sonora
- In office June 11 1868 – August 31 1875
- Preceded by: Imperial prefects Himself as insurgent governor
- Succeeded by: José J. Pesqueira
- In office June 8 1861 – August 10 1865
- Preceded by: José Escalante y Moreno
- Succeeded by: Santiago Campillo (as Prefect of the Department of Sonora); José María Tranquilino Almada (as Prefect of the Department of Álamos); José Moreno Bustamante (as Prefect of the Department of Arizona)
- In office August 28 1858 – April 7 1861
- Preceded by: José de Aguilar y Escobosa
- Succeeded by: Jesús García Morales
- In office August 9 1856 – May 6 1857
- Preceded by: Ramón Encinas
- Succeeded by: José de Aguilar y Escobosa

Insurgent Governor of Sonora
- Provisional
- In office March 18 1866 – June 10 1868
- Preceded by: Jesús García Morales
- Succeeded by: Himself as constitutional governor
- In office August 11 1865 – March 17 1866
- Preceded by: Post establish
- Succeeded by: Jesús García Morales

Personal details
- Born: December 16, 1820 Arizpe, New Navarre, Viceroyalty of New Spain (now Sonora, Mexico)
- Died: January 4, 1886 (aged 65) Bacanuchi, Sonora, Mexico
- Party: Liberal Party
- Spouse(s): Ramona Morales; Elena P. de Pesqueira

Military service
- Allegiance: Carlists; Mexico
- Branch: Mexican Army
- Years of service: 1833 – 1876
- Rank: General
- Battles/wars: First Carlist War; Texas Revolution; Apache–Mexico Wars; Battle at Pozo Hediondo; Revolution of Ayutla; Reform War; Battle of Caborca; Second Franco–Mexican War; Yaqui Wars; Revolution of the Rivers

Ignacio Pesqueira García (1820–1886) was a 19th-century Mexican general and politician. He was the Governor of Sonora over six times, with two of the six terms being an insurgent governor during the Second French intervention in Mexico.

== Childhood ==
Ignacio Pesqueira was born to Mrs. Petra García de Pesqueira of Arizpe, Sonora. While a child, he was sent to Spain to stay with family in Seville, Spain where he attended school. Shortly after the death of Fernando VII, he participated in the First Carlist War along with his classmates, and actively supported the democratic movements that began in Andalusia. He later went to France to pursue a commercial career in Paris. He returned from Europe at the early age of 18, finding Mexico divided between the Conservatives and Liberals.

== Beginnings in his Careers ==
=== Beginning of his Military Career ===
Pesqueira began his military career in the Texas Revolution under General José de Urrea and participated in campaigns against the indigenous people of the north of Mexico, where he attracted the attention of the state government. In 1851, he was wounded by the Apaches while at Pozo Hediondo. He was later appointed Colonel Inspector of the National Guards on the Border.

=== Beginning of his Political Career ===
Known for the liberalism of his principles and his pure patriotism, he was elected as the Deputy to the State Legislature. When the Ayutla Revolution broke out in 1854 at Guerrero and against the dictatorship of Antonio López de Santa Anna, he again joined the liberal army.

== First Governorship ==
In 1856, an armed uprising was carried out commanded by Don Manuel Dávila in Ures against José de Aguilar Domínguez while Pesqueira was the Colonel Inspector of the National Guards as well as First Member and President of the Government Council. He was given these offices by the Organic Statute of Sonora in force in 1856. When the forces commanded by Manuel Dávila, supported by supporters of Manuel María Gándara's Gandarista party, they appointed Ramón Encinas as governor. Pesqueira then assumed the Governorship and gathered forces to fight the usurpers, being able then in that same year to return the governorship to José de Aguilar Domínguez.

== Crabb Massacre ==
Henry A. Crabb organized and carried out an expedition to Altar at the invitation of Pesqueira himself. Although the expedition was unsuccessful, there were accusations that Pesqueira motivated Crabb to come to Sonora, to support him against Gándara's supporters. When Pesqueira was criticized for trying to use US citizens in military actions, Pesqueira ordered their expulsion, the Americans refused and they were defeated at Caborca. By order of Pesqueira himself, 87 prisoners including Crabb were executed by firing squad, in an incident known as the Crabb massacre.

== Plan of Tacubaya and the Reform War ==
He held the position of president of the Government Council, after occupying the state capital, fighting General Francisco Borunda in Guaymas as well as appeasing the Yaquis and fighting at the Filibuster War. He returned the governorship of Sonora to José de Aguilar Domínguez who rejected it because of his illnesses. In the renewal of State Powers, Pesqueira was elected proprietary governor in 1857 to the great joy of his supporters.

After Ignacio Comonfort announced the Plan of Tacubaya, trying to cancel the 1857 Mexican Constitution, he adopted the ideals of Benito Juárez who at that time was the incarnation of Law and the legitimate president of the country. Pesqueira spontaneously and decisively joined him in defending the Constitution, vigorously attacked by the old army in consortium with the clerical side.

This allowed him to be recognized as a defender of the ideas of the 1857 Constitution and kept him as governor of Sonora during the Reform War. In addition to having suppressed a rebellion by Manuel María Gándara, he controlled the attacks of the rebellious tribes of Yaquis and Mayos and the Filibuster expeditions in Mexico. In 1858, José María Yáñez, Governor of Sinaloa, proclaimed his adherence to the Plan of Tacubaya and Pesqueira began a front between Sonora against Sinaloa.

=== War against Sinaloa ===
On April 3, 1859, together with Plácido Vega Daza, he captured the port of Mazatlán after a battle that was bloody and hard-fought. Pesqueira attended with his investiture as Constitutional Governor of Sonora, and he was given the title of Provisional Governor of Sinaloa and General in Chief of the forces of both states and the Baja California Territory. His plan was to continue to Jalisco, but he gave up since his presence was required in Sonora.

=== Guaymas Incident ===
Before continuing in the Reform War, in 1858, after a diplomatic conflict that varied in scale, the then American consul in Guaymas, Don Roberto Rose, had to leave the port, illegally appointing a vice-consul Fawelly Allden while the Sonoran authorities weren't informed about this. The commander of the USS St. Mary's (1844), of the United States Navy, Commander W. O. Porter, demanded that the vice-consul be recognized but Pesqueira disagreed and demanded that Charles Pomeroy Stone be re-admitted to finish the demarcation of the lands of Guaymas, as well as the release of his Commander in Chief Richard S. Ewell. He also demanded the return of a mule that had been stolen from him and that if he didn't follow through all these demands, he would land troops in Guaymas. As Ignacio Pesqueira and a handful of men began to mobilize and the Americans vice-versa, a letter from Richard S. Ewell and a last-minute decision settled matters between both countries.

=== Indigenous uprisings ===
By 1860, he was once again in Sonora as he was forced by political and military events that demanded his presence, since his enemies had launched the indigenous tribes made up of the Yaquis, Mayos, Apaches, and Opatas into revolt and robbery. After appeasing the Apaches in the north of the state, he needed help in the south so he personally sought to appease the Yaquis who had taken up arms again, at a point called "Las Guásimas" in Guaymas. They escaped from being captured by their rivals, being saved by the old soldier Don José Montijo, who climbed him on his horse already wounded and with many difficulties. After that incident, he couldn't end the same with the Yaqui revolution because there were remnants of the Opata uprisings of Refugio Tánori, which he had to fight.

At the beginning of 1861, tired of the revolts, he traveled again to Guaymas to the town of Tórim which was the epicenter of the Yaqui uprising, asking José Escalante y Moreno to take charge of the government. He then carried out several assaults and had quite a few successes, being able to suppress the Yaqui uprisings to a certain extent.

=== Estébez's attack on Sonora ===
In 1861 Colonel Estébez from El Fuerte, Sinaloa attacked the city of Álamos proclaiming the Plan of Tacubaya again, although this movement was not supported by the government of Sinaloa. Pesqueira was expecting him to enter the city of Hermosillo and after a battle in the city, Pesqueira defeats and ends any further invasions of Sonora in the war.

== Second French Intervention in Mexico ==
Sonora, despite the immense distance from the theater where the initial events of the Second French intervention in Mexico took place, didn't want to participate without the honor of being represented in the Mexican Republican Army that was preparing to fight. Pesqueira organized a contingent of a thousand men between two divisions, embarking in Guaymas in July 1862 to continue towards Mazatlán and from there join forces with the governor of Sinaloa bound for Mexico City.

=== Disaster of La Pasión ===
In 1865, during the French Intervention and the establishment of the Second Mexican Empire, after the end of March of that year, the French troops under the command of General Armand Alexandre de Castagny attacked the port of Guaymas and the Republican soldiers commanded by the General Ignacio Pesqueira and General Patoni had to withdraw to a place known as the Valley of La Pasión, north of San José de Guaymas. There, one of the strangest actions of the confrontation between French and Mexicans took place.

Indeed, in May 1865, a party of only fifty French horsemen under the command of Colonel Isidoro Teódulo Garnier unexpectedly attacked the Mexican camp in which there were more than a thousand Republican soldiers under the command of Pesqueira and García Morales, sowing confusion and even the panic among those Sonoran troops that began a shameful rout. This action is known in the history of Sonora as "The Disaster of La Pasión".

=== Pro-Imperial Mexican Uprisings ===
The Disaster of La Pasión caused the uprisings to begin throughout the state in favor of the Empire with the indigenous rising up first and followed by uprisings in main cities. Pesqueira managed to gather troops in Hermosillo but without financing, he had to go further into the state He then relocated to Ures, being attacked and defeated by pro-Imperialist forces and having to move to Tubac, Arizona.

=== The Return to Sonora and the Fight Against the Empire ===
At the beginning of 1866, General Don Ángel Martínez took the city of Álamos. This army, together with the news of some victories by García Morales, favored Pesqueira's return from exile. By the middle of 1866, Martínez, Pesqueira and García Morales, had had some victories in the state. Once restored, he returns to the fight and on September 4, 1866, defeated Edvard Emile Langberg at the Battle of Guadalupe and put an end to foreign intervention in Sonora.

=== 1867 Governorship ===
President Benito Juárez issued on August 24, 1867, for the call for elections of public officials in the country and by virtue of it. On September 27, Governor Pesqueira called for elections of State Powers, which took place in October.

The third constitutional Congress of the state was installed on November 28 and declared Pesqueira governor of Sonora and substitute for General Jesús García Morales. By virtue of this declaration, the first granted the protest on December 1 and continued in the exercise of power, already covered by the constitutional character.

=== Revolution de los Ríos ===
Pesqueira resigned as governor to deal with another uprising of the Yaqui and Mayo peoples who, at the end of 1867, dissatisfied with the federal victory against the French, took up arms thinking that the Mexican Empire would return. The uprising of the Yaqui and Mayo tribes took their rebellion very seriously as the rebels in Bácum killed the Military Commander that the government had appointed to ensure civility. The Yaquis penetrated the Mayo River. In December, they attacked and knifed a garrison that was in Santa Cruz, murdering the indigenous chief Matías and fourteen others of his tribe.

After some victories, in May 1868 the Revolution de los Ríos was believed to have ended, and the Military Commander, General Jesús García Morales, ordered the forces that were campaigning to withdraw in June. However, as soon as they had withdrawn, the Mayos, on July 5, attacked the town of Etchojoa, killing 18 people as well as the Apaches continued fighting in Northern Sonora.

=== The Retreat ===
By 1868, Pesqueira, already tired and wanting to attend to his personal business, retired from politics and left Manuel Monteverde Díaz in command, although on December 20 of that same year he had to take over the governorship again after several floods and disasters occurred in Álamos.

== State elections of 1869 ==
In 1869, the renewal of the Powers of the State was made through popular elections. The opposition circles moved with some effort, but Pesqueira was always re-elected governor and this was declared by the new Legislature on October 14 despite Pesqueira requesting to leave months before. Pesqueira then appointed deputy Don Julián Escalante as his substitute, retiring to his hacienda, Las Delicias.

== Juárez's Government (1871-1872) ==
=== State elections of 1871 ===
In June 1871 elections were held for the renewal of local Powers. This time he fought the candidacy of Governor Pesqueira with that of his old friend and companion, General Jesús García Morales, with whom he was no longer in the best harmony. The latter obtained all the votes in the district of Álamos, half of those in Moctezuma, and very few in the other districts. On September 15, the new Congress was installed and on the 22nd it declared Pesqueira re-elected by 165 votes against 51 who voted for General Morales. Deputy Don Joaquín M. Astiazarán was appointed as substitute governor.

=== Plan de la Noria ===
At the same time as these elections, those of Federal Powers were held. The fight between the candidacies of Benito Juárez and General Porfirio Díaz was very fierce throughout the country and even after it was over, it left a deep impression on the Republic and produced such discontent that it did not take long for the revolution to break out. On October 1, Generals Negrete, Toledo, Chavarría and other army chiefs managed to seize the capital. Although the revolutionary movement was immediately suffocated, it was not long before General Jerónimo Treviño rose up against the government in Nuevo León, Borrego in Durango, Palacios in Sinaloa and General Díaz himself in Oaxaca, proclaiming the Plan de la Noria in November. In a short time, the entire country was involved in a civil war that seriously threatened the established order.

The state congress gave General Pesqueira permission to personally lead his efforts to fight the revolutionaries in Sinaloa. Pesqueira then defeated General Francisco Cañedo and General Eulogio Parra, capturing Culiacán.

=== Battle of Culiacán ===
Due to revolts calling for General Porfirio Díaz's presidency having broken out in Mazatlán, the Sonora Legislature granted Pesqueira the power to help restore peace in Sinaloa on December 7. On the 14th, at the head of some forces, he marched from Ures to Álamos, to whose city he arrived on January 8, 1872, and on the 16th, he marched on Sinaloa.

That plaza was occupied by General Manuel Márquez de León and Pesqueira laid siege to him on the 21st. After a close battle in the Plaza de Armas, Pesqueira was defeated just as he was approaching victory. Disgruntled but not dejected, Pesqueira returned to Álamos with some officers four days later, there he began to organize new forces, in addition to the troops recruited in Álamos, the Districts of Moctezuma, Ures, Arizpe and Sahuaripa sent him new contingents, being able to quickly mobilize a thousand men. On May 1, Pesqueira was already in El Fuerte, where he left commissioners to organize more forces and continued his march on Sinaloa where he stopped for a few days waiting for more reinforcements.

On the 21st of the same month, he undertook his march on Culiacán with a thousand men and six artillery pieces, at a time when Márquez was heading from Elota to the same plaza with more than 2,000 men. On the night of the 26th, Pesqueira arrived in Culiacán and took possession of part of the city. At dawn the following day, the revolutionary chief occupied another part of the town, establishing his line of defense. Hostilities then broke out on both sides and for forty-one days, the cannon and rifle fires were kept alive without interruption. This went on until General Sóstenes Rocha finally arrived in Mazatlán with 2,000 reinforcements and put an end to the grueling battle for the civilians of Culiacan. On the afternoon of May 6, after a bombardment over the part of the city occupied by Pesqueira, Márquez withdrew with his forces through Tamazula to the state of Durango . The Sonora forces began their return march, Pesqueira went to Mazatlan and gave Rocha an account of his operations; on the 28th of the same month he landed in Guaymas and on June 6 he arrived in Ures.

== Reforms of 1872 ==
=== Conflict between the Judicial and Legislative Branches ===
On May 25, 1869, the debate began on certain reforms to the constitution of the State of Sonora. The main ones of those reforms, initiated on May 25, 1869, were the following:

- I. That the criminal trials, instead of three, only have two instances.
- II. Elimination of the precept that established the jury system for criminal trials.
- III. Restriction to the faculties of the Executive Power to impose correctional sentences.
- IV. Take away from the Yaqui and Mayo tribes the rights of Sonoran citizens while they preserve the anomalous organization they have in their ranches or towns, but leaving the enjoyment of them to the individuals of the same tribes who reside in the organized towns of the state.
- V. Direct election of all public officials.
- SAW. Non-reelection of Governor, Lieutenant Governor and Prefects of the Districts.
- VII Popular election of lieutenant governor, magistrates of the Supreme Court of Justice and Judges of First Instance, which was made by appointment of Congress
- VII. Popular election of Prefects of the Districts, which was made by appointment of the Executive.
- IX. Empower the President of Congress to sanction and publish the laws when the term in which the Executive should do so has passed, but does not do so.

On November 1, 1872, the State Congress approved said constitutional reforms, which produced a clash between the Executive and Legislative powers for their sanction, since Governor Pesqueira did not respect that decision and the conflict between powers took place. The reformist deputies met in December to protest the new Constitution, but a Pesqueirista deputy left the room, leaving them without a sufficient quorum. The remaining six deputies did not form Congress and therefore couldn't protest the reforms, so they dissolved before giving a manifesto to the public in local newspapers.

=== Conant's Uprising in 1873 ===
On April 22, 1873, a new Constitution was issued that came into force on September 16, in which the reforms initiated in 1869 were excluded, with the exception of "VI" that prohibited the re-election of the state governor.

The conflict did not end here as public opinion, which was no longer very favorable to the Pesqueira government, was more strongly against it because of the question of state reforms, and it was that the people were already tired of a public administration whose head had not changed since 1856. Another factor was when the elections for the renewal of those in charge of public power took place in 1873, the Government did not have any opposition and Pesqueira was re-elected once again, without any contradiction.

This fact caused the citizen to lose faith in the institution as they had no hope of obtaining a path through suffrage and preferred to patiently resign themselves to undertaking a sterile struggle. On the night of September 19 of the same year of 1873, Don Carlos Conant pronounced himself in the Mineral de Promontorios, Municipality of Álamos. He took the Plaza de Álamos in the early morning of the 20th, proclaiming the constitutional reforms of 1872 and not recognizing Pesqueira administration. State forces quickly pursued Conant, having a minor encounter in Conicarit on October 30 and, finally, Conant withdrew to Chihuahua through Chinipas, handing over his weapons to the authorities of that Villa.

=== The Idle Governor ===
Since the rise of Conant in 1873, Pesqueira requested several and successive licenses to return to his permissions as it seems that he didn't want to govern and constantly left the position to substitute or provisional governors, especially to Joaquín M. Astiazarán. One day, the state government asked him: "How many licenses and extensions did you request?"

== Yaqui conspiracies and the 1875 elections ==
Since April 1875, symptoms of a forthcoming tribal insurrection began to make themselves felt in the Yaqui, stimulated by the new leader who appeared there, José María Leyva, who with patriotic ardor, preached to the Yaquis the need to recover the independence of those communities, awakening the pride of those tribes. The possible uprising of ethnic groups in the region and the elections, in addition to the prohibition of a re-election by Ignacio Pesqueira, favored the candidacy of José J. Pesqueira, who was elected as governor and as senators Don Joaquín M. Astiazarán and Don Ignacio Pesqueira, being all fishermen, caused an impact on the population.

Notwithstanding everything else, General Ignacio Pesqueira himself was appointed by Congress as substitute governor, this result left a very deep impression in Sonora, although in some spirits it caused discouragement, in others it caused true exaltation. Although Congress called for elections extraordinary elections to the districts whose suffrage had been nullified, the opposition party, understanding the practical futility of its efforts, remained in complete abstention and the government elected, without obstacles, the deputies that it judged most convenient for its aims.

Meanwhile, the electoral preparations were made and the elections were verified. Governor Pesqueira had been elected by decree of June 24, with extraordinary powers in finance and war, taking the alarms of the Yaqui and Mayo rivers as a reason, these powers were extended in decree of July 25 and June 30 of the same month.

=== Sernist Revolution of 1875-1877 ===
Due to all these circumstances, rumors began to circulate of an upcoming revolution headed by the District Judge, Domingo Elías González, the head of the Treasury, Alfonso Mejía, and by other characters dissatisfied by the Government of Pesqueira. Pesqueira was preparing to fight and in addition to the extraordinary contribution that it decreed, it issued a regulation dated July 27 for the organization of forces in the state.

It was thus that on August 11, 1875, twenty days before José J. Pesqueira took office, Francisco Serna and Francisco Lizárraga simultaneously spoke in the Villa del Altar and in San Ignacio. Don Manuel Barreda and Don Antonio Aguirre, and the next day Don Antonio Searcy did the same in Santa Ana, who immediately marched with the people he could gather to join Serna. The Government was prepared and without wasting time, appointed Don Francisco Altamirano y Altamirano, chief some towns along the Cucurpe River, who was given the appointment of Military Commander of the Districts of Altar and Magdalena. He then began operations near the Altar and on August 23, Altamirano defeated them and immediately occupied the Villa.

Francisco Serna and Lizárraga, seeing the small forces that they had organized destroyed and losing their weapons and equipment and understanding the impossibility of recovering them on the border, fled to Tucson, Arizona, where they had allies to help them repair the losses suffered, making use of their own interests and their credit.

On November 8, a force of cavalry led by Francisco Serna crossed the border, entered Sonora, defeated the chief Don Francisco Redondo on November 11 in Calera and occupied the town of Altar but they were defeated again by Francisco Altamirano y Altamirano. At Arizpe, Don Juan Clímaco Escalante, gathered men and defeated the fishing chief Don Cayetano Silva in Santa Cruz in a short time.

=== Yaqui uprising ===
While the situation in the north of the state was in full swing, in the south the Yaquis under the command of Cajeme, attacked the town of Cócorit while the Mayos attacked the town of Santa Cruz de Huatabampo in the south .

These new uprisings forced Governor José J. Pesqueira to send forces to the south of the state and thus fight on two fronts, to the south he sent Commander Leonardo Aguirre, and to the north and Ignacio Pesqueira as chief of all forces to contain the Sernist revolution.

=== Battle of Pitahaya ===
Under the command of José J. Pesqueira on December 1, 1875, in the vicinity of Pitahaya, the battle between elements of the Mexican Army, composed of five hundred soldiers, and elements of the Yaqui army with 1,500 troops took place. The confrontation was reported by Pesqueira as a Mexican victory, ensuring the death of approximately 60 Yaquis.

=== The revolution in the center and north of the state ===
In the north, more and more people rose up in arms against the Sonoran government, so Don Francisco E. González took the city of Ures with men recruited in Rayón and Opodepe. This didn't last long however as by 1876, they were defeated by fishing forces.

In December 1875, Ignacio Pesqueira marched towards Santa Cruz with about 300 men that he gathered in Arizpe to fight Francisco Serna and Juan Clímaco Escalante, who in view of that, both divided and withdrew. Francisco Serna headed for the town of Altar and Juan Clímaco Escalante headed for Bacoachi. Francisco Serna, knowing Pesqueira's intentions, took refuge in Arizona, however Escalante took the route south, participating in some minor battles and joining forces with local chiefs in Alamos .

Francisco Serna, still in Arizona, communicated with his allies in Hermosillo. Due to this contact, Don Antonio Palacio was given command of 200 men who took up arms in Hermosillo on December 1, 1876, and attacked General José V. Escalante who was in charge of only sixty which made the capture of the city quick. Francisco Serna, in order to support his allies in Hermosillo and spark off the revolution in the primary city, mobilized a force 150 cavalry and infantrymen under the command of Commander Jesús Campa, who arrived shortly after Palacio occupied the square of Hermosillo. While he organized the people who came to him en-masse, Campa went to the town of Séris and from there he went to the Represo, where he established his camp.

Governor José J. Pesqueira asked the federal government for support to deal with said situation, so Jesús García Morales was assigned to defend the Guaymas plaza.

== Death and legacy ==
Pesqueira exercised absolute power for a period of 20 years in Sonora, for which his detractors considered him a dictator, however the great services he rendered to the liberal cause as a general more than legitimized his right to go down in history. He died on January 4, 1886, at his hacienda in Bacanuchi, in his birthplace Deél Arizpe Deél, Sonora, in a very peaceful manner contrary to his life. He left few possessions to his children and his wife. The General Ignacio L. Pesqueira International Airport was named after him.
