= José María Tranquilino Almada =

Mexican colonel (1822-1866)

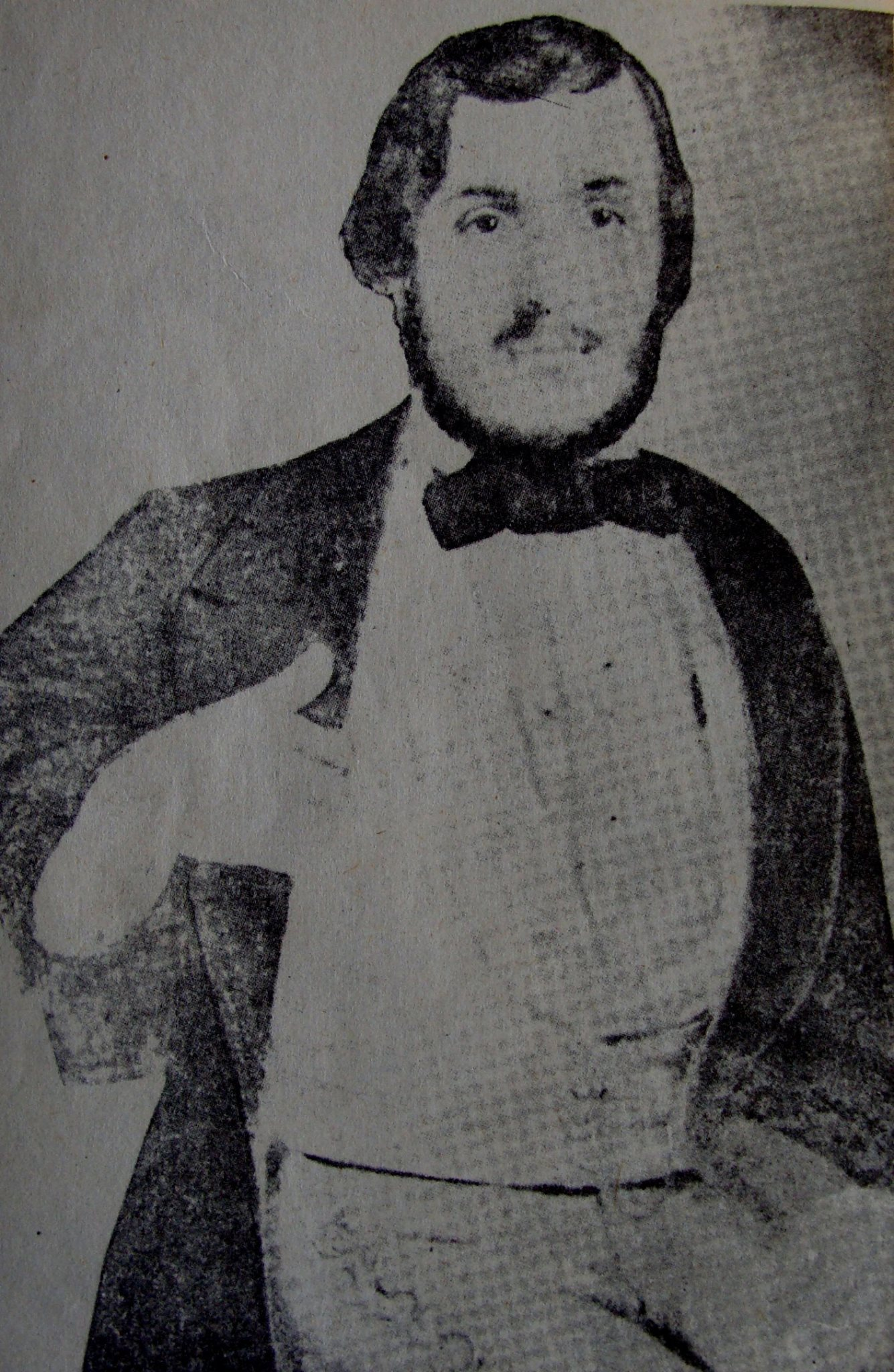

Prefect of the Department of Álamos
- In office March 3 1865 – September 20 1866
- Appointed by: Maximilian I
- Preceded by: Office stablished
- Succeeded by: Ignacio Pesqueira (As governor of Sonora)

Personal details
- Born: July 6, 1822 Álamos, Estado de Occidente, First Mexican Empire
- Died: June 20, 1866 (aged 43) Gulf of California, near Baja California Sur
- Awards: Imperial Order of the Mexican Eagle
- Nickname: Chato Almada

Military service
- Allegiance: Second Mexican Empire
- Branch: Imperial Mexican Army
- Years of service: 1865 – 1866
- Rank: Colonel
- Battles/wars: Second French intervention in Mexico; Battle of Álamos

José María Tranquilino Almada y Quirós (1822-1866) was an Imperial Mexican Colonel of the Second French intervention in Mexico. Popularly known as Chato Almada, he was one of the most prominent monarchist figures within the state of Sonora, known for his victory at the Battle of Álamos.

== Biography ==
Almada was born in the town of Álamos in 1822. His father, José María Almada, was the governor of the Estado de Occidente, the predecessor to the states of Sonora and Sinaloa. Almada had been an Álamos city councilor, and in 1860 took up arms in defense of General Ignacio Pesqueira's government during the rebellion led by Don Remigio Rivera. He commanded a section of the National Guard, defeated the Mayo rebels in Navojoa and pacified the Mayo River. The following year, he distanced himself from the local government due to the deaths of his brothers Vicente and Toribio, who had participated in the conservative rebellion of Estévez. The events of the Second French intervention in Mexico and the Second Mexican Empire didn't effect Almada until August 1865, when Álamos was occupied by a section of French auxiliary troops commanded by Imperial Prefect Fortino Vizcaíno. Almada then swore his allegiance to Santiago Campillo and General Isidoro Teódulo Garnier, began his military career at Guaymas, and began exerting his influence across Sonora in favor of the Empire. He immediately moved to Navojoa to influence the Mayo to his cause. Days later he retreated to Álamos, which had been recovered by Republican General Antonio Rosales. During the ensuing Battle of Álamos, Rosales was defeated and killed by Almada's forces, with the aggravating circumstance that one of his sons was wrongly identified as being responsible for the union with Vizcaíno. Almada kept the region under his control and was promoted by Maximilian I to the rank of colonel, appointed as the prefect of the department of Álamos, and awarded the Officer's Cross of the Order of the Mexican Eagle.

On November 18, 1865, he was awarded the Order of Guadalupe along with the other leaders and officers who had participated in the Battle of Álamos. He took his weapons to the region of the Fuerte River, where he left a garrison, and on January 7, 1866, he was defeated and evicted from Álamos by the Republican troops commanded by General Ángel Martínez. He fled for the center of the state to reorganize his forces, but on May 4 he was defeated by Martínez in Hermosillo. A few hours later, his men took revenge and defeated the Republicans, who had to give up the area, and he fought with Colonel Palacio in Minas Nuevas and returned to occupy the city of Álamos. On August 20, he was forced to vacate the town by the Republican soldiers and withdrew in the direction of Navojoa. From there he brought reinforcements and attacked, but was completely defeated on September 2. The Empire was languishing, because at the same time Edvard Emile Langberg and Refugio Tánori had been defeated at the Battle of Guadalupe. Almada took the road to the port of Guaymas, where he embarked on a ship with other compromised soldiers attempting to escape. Martínez recovered the port and put a ship under the command of Colonel Salazar Bustamente which went in pursuit of the fugitives, reaching some off the coast of Santa Rosalía and others in Mulegé. At the time of his capture, without any resistance, Almada was killed by Captain Abato Avilés, in revenge for the execution of his brother Lorenzo at Álamos months before by a court martial ruling.
