= Battle at Pozo Hediondo =

1851 Battle during Apache wars

Battle At Pozo Hediondo
- Part of Apache Wars
| Date | January 20th, 1851 |
| Location | Sonora, Mexico |
| Result | Indesicive |

Belligerents
| Mexico | Apache Indians |

Commanders and leaders
| Ignacio Pesqueira | Mangas Coloradas |

Casualties and losses
| 18-27 Killed and 50 Wounded | 70 Killed and Undetermined number of Wounded |

The Battle at Pozo Hediondo took place on January 20, 1851, during the Apache Wars. On January 20, 1851, a Mexican Patrol spotted a cloud of dust just south of Pozo Hediondo ("Smelly Springs" or "Stinky Springs") where it was believed the cloud of dust was created by a returning Indians from the North with the goods they had taken from a raid. The Mexican troops set up to ambush the Indian caravan. The Mexican forces outnumbered the Apache two to one and would attack them with bullets and arrows, forcing the Apache to abandon all the stock and goods they had just raided. Ignacio Pesqueria sent his Mexican troops to pursue the retreating Indians but failed to realize that Mangas Coloradas was coming up the valley to surprise attack the Mexican troops. The next three hours would consist of hand-to-hand combat, being referred to as "a war to the knife" by Coloradas.

The famous Geronimo was heavily involved in the battle. The Chiricahua Indians struck from both the front and the back. Many Indians (Including Geronimo's) reputation increased significantly after this. In the area of the battle where Geronimo was located, he was the only one left standing. The Battle of Pozo Hediondo had no clear winner, both sides retreated with heavy casualties.

== Location ==
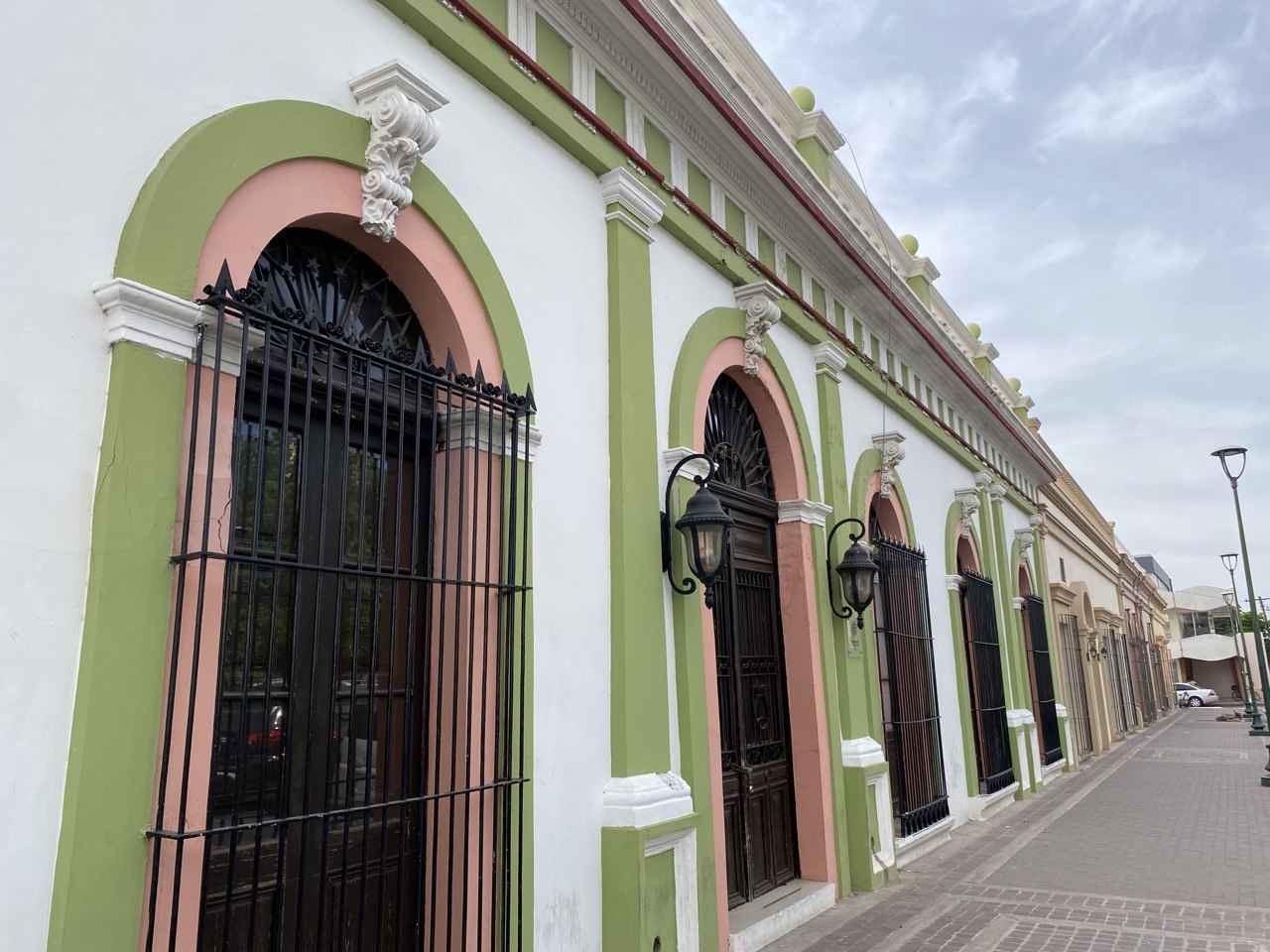
Modern Day Photo of Hermosillo, Sonora

Pozo Hediondo is located in Sonora, Mexico. As of today, there is a ranch by the name of Rancho el Pozo Hediondo, home to a livestock breeder. Pozo Hediondo is located approximately 3 hours and 39 minutes from Sonora's capital, Hermosillo.

== Prelude ==
=== Apache Wars ===
The Apache Wars can be linked to a number of different wars that would span from 1849 to 1924. The Battle at Pozo Hediondo took place in the very early stages of the Apache Wars. The United States and the Apache would be at war after Mexico had surrendered territory following the conclusion of the Mexican-American War. With the Apache Wars being more complex than it solely being between the United States and the Apache, they were split into different sub wars that will be listed for further examination. The Wars included are, Jicarilla War, Chiricahua Wars, Texas Indian Wars, Yavapai Wars, Victoria's War, and Geronimo's War.

The Apache Wars was not only between the United States and Apache but also Mexico and the Apache. The Apache-Mexico Wars were also relevant during the 1830s-1850s. The Spanish and Mexicans had waged a relentless war against the Apache who fought back without hesitation. The Apache were determined to not become conquered as the Indians of Mexico had. With this, when the United States did gain Mexican territories they also received the Apache who were fierce and would not be easily conquered.

==== Chiricahua raids ====
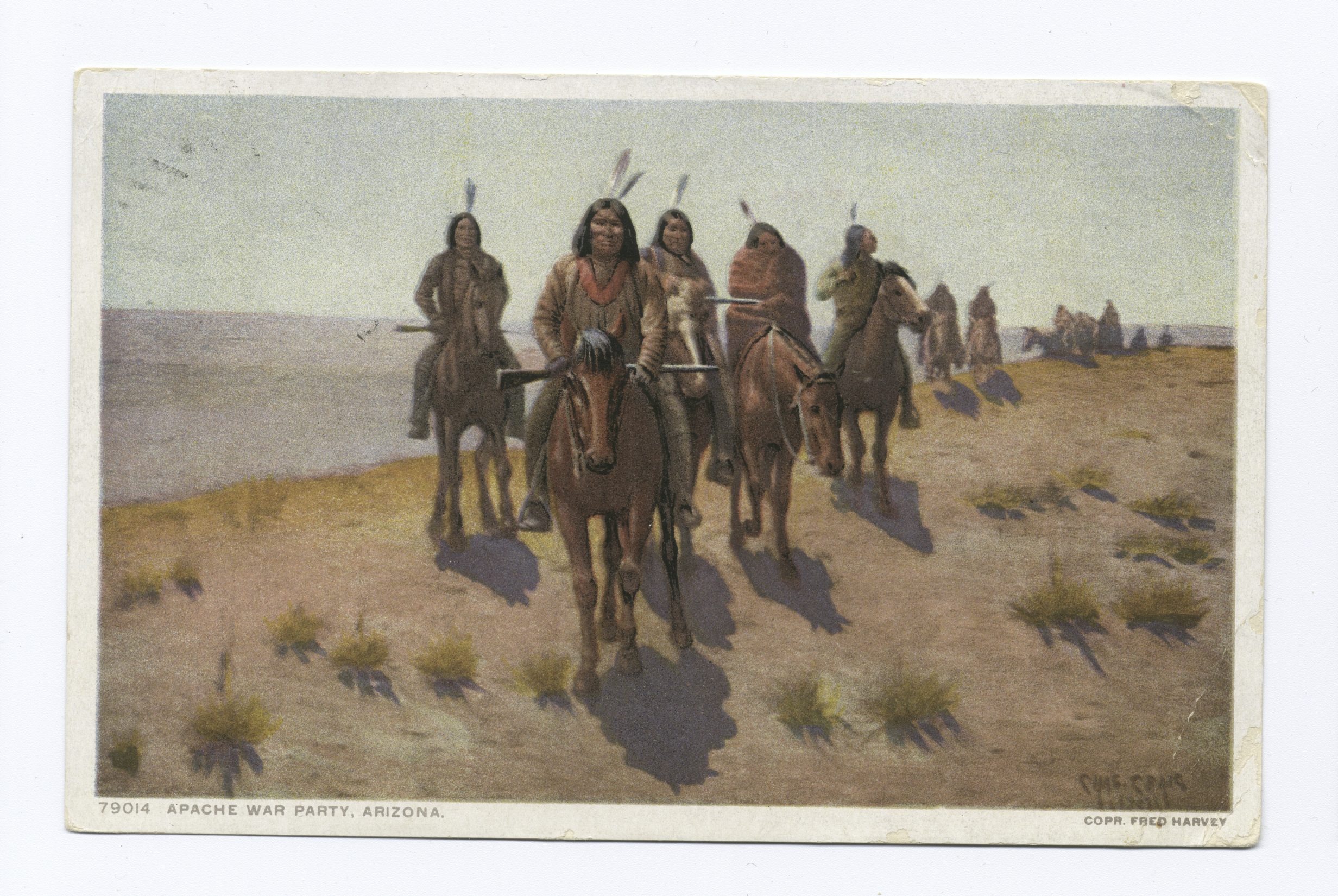
Apache War Party

Chiricahua Indians were trained for wars and raids from a young age. Their training for this lifestyle began when they hit puberty and would be brought out with their immediate family to raids for "toughening". Before a raid, the Chiricahua (as well as other Apache bands) would notify a handful that they would go to Mexico to raid. These men were out to get goods and animals from the Mexicans.

=== Build-up ===
Two Chiricahua Campaigns were underway in Sonora, Mexico. One of these Campaigns would be led by Mangas Coloadas who would be accompanied by Geronimo and around 150 men. This group of Apache Indians would stay around the area of Hermosillo while the other group was located in the Sahuaripa District. Both groups had expected for more retaliation from the Mexicans but that did not happen. The people of Sonora were not ready for the Campaigns of the Apache. Coloadas and Geronimo were successful in their raids just before they encountered Mexican Forces at Pozo Hediondo. The Apache crew had set off North with over 1,300 cattle and horses with them. Ignacio Pesqueira was able to anticipate their route and would send 100 nationals from Arizpe and Bacoachi to Pozo Hediondo.

== Aftermath ==
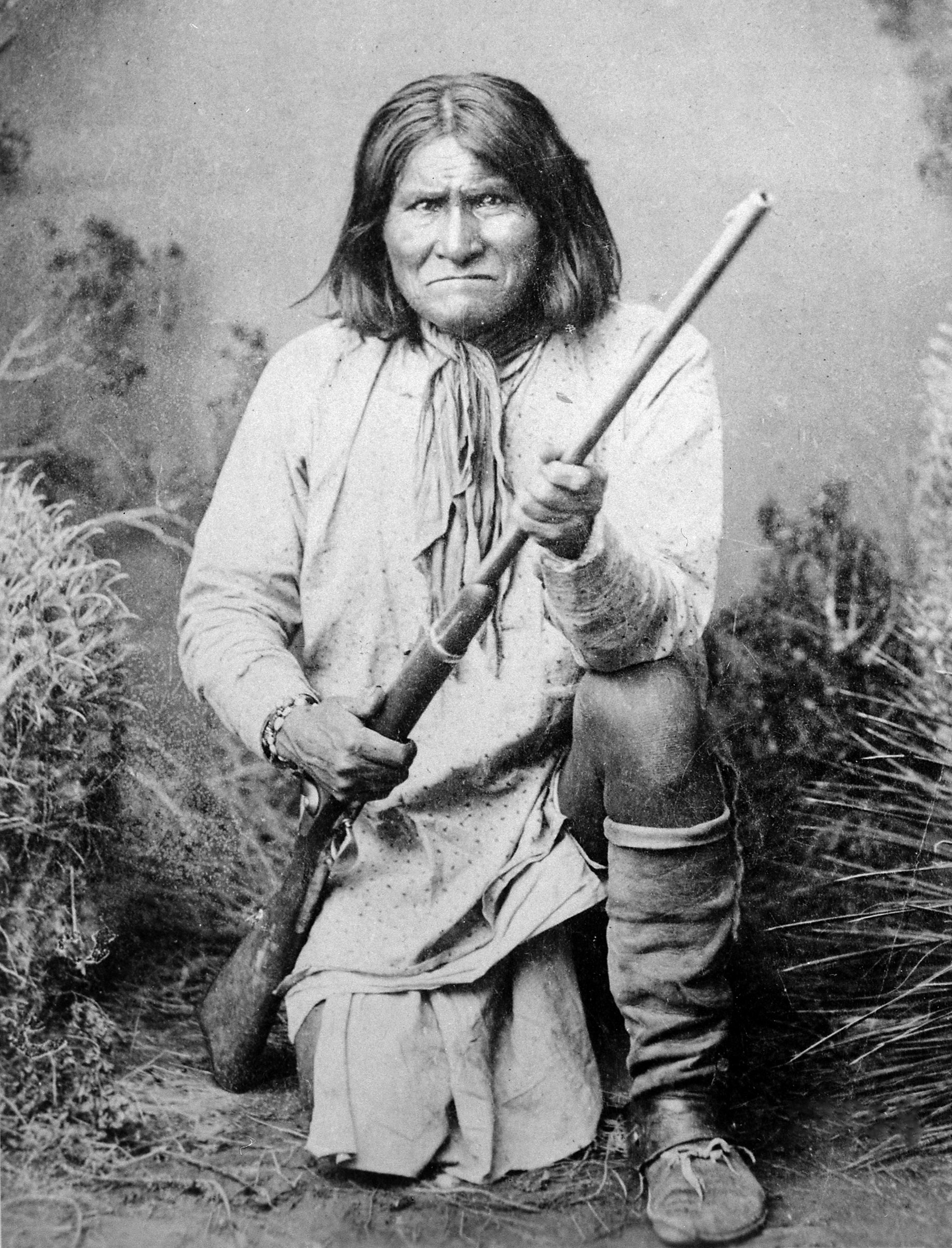
Famous Image of Geronimo, 1887

Following the Battle at Pozo Hediondo, there were a number of casualties. While it is probably an exaggeration, a Mexican eyewitness had noted that they either killed or wounded around 70 of the Apache men. Another account of the event notes of the Mexican losses of around 26 killed with another 46 seriously wounded out of the 100 Mexican Forces that were involved. This is where Geronimo was supposedly named war chief. On January 21, the Apache party headed out for Bacoachi. The group would end up killing six civilians and capturing a number of other to be ransomed. With Geronimo earning his keep at Pozo Hediondo, he would go on to become a great military leader for the Apache Indians. Geronimo would lead the Apache people out of their reservations that had been taken over by the United States and put them back into their nomadic lifestyle. Geronimo would be the last Native American leader to surrender to the United States and would be a war prisoner at Fort Sill in Oklahoma territory.

Ignacio Pesqueira's survived the battle but his horse was shot and wounded, forcing Pesqueira to travel on foot. Several days after, he appeared in the town of Arizpe, where he would be greeted and recognized as hero by Governor José de Aguilar. This also began Ignacio Pesqueira's political career, being appointed as the Deputy and would eventually become the Major in the state militia. He continued to be involved in Sonora politics.
