= Abigael Bohórquez =

Mexican poet and playwright

Abigael Bohórquez (12 March 1936 — 28 November 1995) was a Mexican poet and playwright.

== Life and career ==
Bohórquez was born in Caborca, Sonora, Mexico, on 12 March 1936. Many of his works are social criticisms. He was also one of the first writers to deal with the theme of homosexuality in Mexican poetry. His first book was Ensayos Poéticos in 1955, when he was just nineteen years old with no formal training. He studied the dramatic arts at the Instituto Nacional de Bellas Artes (INBA) and the Instituto Cinematográfico de la Asociación Nacional de Actores. He was influenced by the much older gay poet Carlos Pellicer while living in Mexico City.

Shortly after, his work began to gain recognitions such as the Primer Concurso Latinoamericano XEW for his poetry and various from the Universidad Nacional Autónoma de México. He became a professor at the Academia de Arte Dramático of the Universidad de Sonora and director for two theatre groups. Bohórquez died in Hermosillo in 1995 after writing eighteen works of poetry and plays. Some of these include Poesía I teatro, La hoguera en el pañuelo, Canción de amor y muerte por Rubén Jaramillo, and Las amarras terrestres.

Bohórquez died on 28 November 1995 in Hermosillo, Sonora.
