= Parker H. French =

American fraudster (1826–1878)

Parker Hardin French
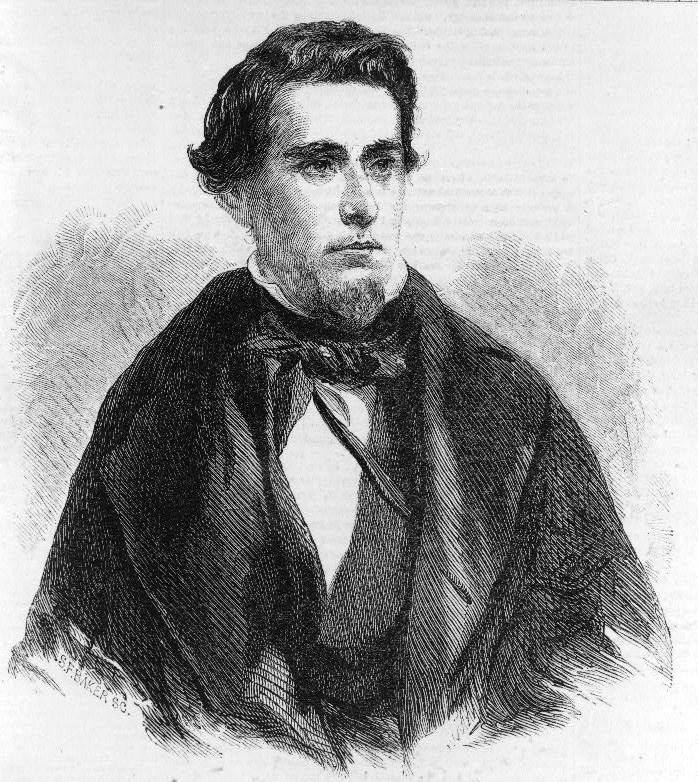
- A wood engraving of French by S. F. Baker from a Brady ambrotype
- Born: April 2, 1826; Mason County, Kentucky
- Died: June 19, 1878 (aged 52); Washington, D.C.

Parker Hardin French (1826 – 1878) was an adventurer, entrepreneur, and swindler, labeled and chronicled by author Joe Goodbody as the “Kentucky Barracuda.” As a runaway child he fought as a member of the Royal Navy in the First Opium War as a cabin boy and a "powder monkey". At only 22, he was a commission merchant and a year later built the first ocean going ship on the upper Mississippi. Before he was 30, he was the leader of an infamous and fraudulent gold rush expedition; implicated in an irregular invasion of Cuba; jailed bandit and then military hero in Mexico; lawyer, district attorney, legislator, journalist, and political enforcer in California; he was a real estate developer; lawyer; journalist; part of a conspiracy to invade Mexico; suspected seditionist agitator and Confederate agent; jailed as a political prisoner; and lawyer and purveyor for Union troops. His final days were spent in obscurity but the period was still peppered with the occasional swindle that garnered both regional and national attention.

== Youth, marriage, and his first scam ==
Ned McGowan, who knew French in 1854 and 1855 in California, summarized his life in two newspapers articles in 1879; Kenneth Johnson republished them with a commentary in 1958. McGowan cited no evidence, as his source 25 years earlier was French himself. McGowan related that Parker Hardin French was born around 1826 in Kentucky, was orphaned while very young, taken in by a neighboring family of a Judge Edwards and married his foster sister, Lucretia Edwards. McGowan's version probably conflated a few different stories that Parker French told about his youth, and the account likely got distorted with time. Hampered by lack of access to genealogical records and unassisted by the digital age, historians have accepted the McGowan version of French's early life. But the real story is much different. Parker Hardin French was born on April 2, 1826, in Mason County, Kentucky. His parents were Hiram Duncan French (c. 1795 – 1872) and Margaret Calhoun Hardin (1802–1832). Hiram was from a farming family that had relocated from Virginia to Kentucky in the early 1790s. Margaret, the daughter of Martin L. Hardin, was the progeny of a highly cultured, prominent, and powerful Kentucky family full of military heroes, lawyers, judges, and politicians. For the first several years, the young Parker French lived on what was likely a struggling farm, with older sister Juliet Catherine (1822–1905), and younger sister Mary Jane (1830–1913). In 1832, sister Arzelia (1832–1924) was born, possibly precipitating the death of Parker's mother in October. The young Parker's life changed dramatically when his maternal uncle and namesake, Judge Parker Calhoun Hardin (1800–1876), took in the young boy. Hardin treated the boy like a son, fostered his development and lifelong connections and provided the best education available to affluent antebellum Kentuckians. Boosted by access to an extensive and valuable private library French inevitably acquired what the local paper described as a "disposition to roam." Parker Hardin French caught wanderlust and ran away from home. He signed on with the British Navy and sailed on a man-of-war as a "powder monkey" during the First Opium War (1839–1842). He returned full of stories of his adventures and financial coups. When French returned from service to Queen Victoria, Hardin sent him to Alton, Illinois to live with the powerful and politically connected Judge Cyrus Edwards, a former Kentucky lawyer well known to the Hardin family. He married the Judge's daughter Lucretia in April 1849, with whom he would sire four children: Matilda Strong, 1850–1921; Hugh Murray 1854–1912; Nancy Reed 1858-Unk; and Ellie Lucretia 1866-Unk. It was in nearby St. Louis that year that he put together his first scam. Doing business as "Messrs. French & Co." French launched an unfinished ship, promising to transport gold seekers to California. The 700-ton bark, christened the Matilda, was still unfinished when "she was sold by the Sheriff, to pay for her material and labor." McGowan wrote that French absconded, leaving "behind him a number of debts for borrowed money and for shipbuilding."

== Captain Parker H. French's California Expedition ==
French and his wife arrived in New York City about the beginning of 1850. Daughter Matilda Strong French was born there in February. Before long, French – having granted himself the rank of "Captain" – had taken an office in the Tammany Building, had placed ads in the newspapers, and had flyers printed describing his plan to lead an expedition to the gold fields of California for a fee of $250. One flyer began,

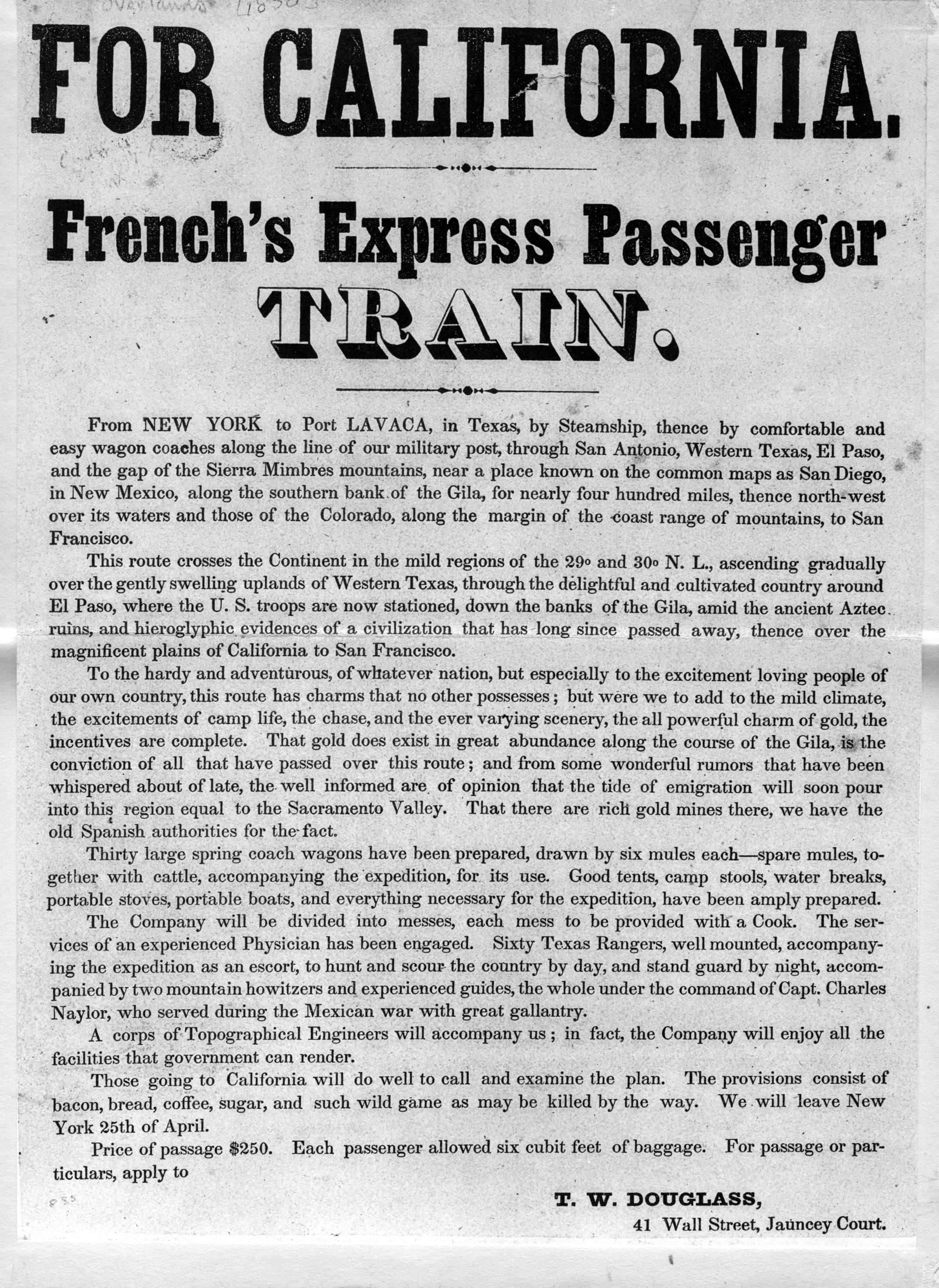
Johnson reproduced this handbill in his edition of McGowan.

"From NEW YORK to Port LAVACA, in Texas, by Steamship, thence by comfortable and easy wagon coaches ... over the gently swelling uplands of Western Texas," along the Gila River, down to the Colorado, and, finally, across "the magnificent plains of California" (the Colorado Desert) to San Francisco. Moreover, as John Holmes, who signed on with his son for $500, pointed out, "French obligated himself to the company that he would take us through to California in sixty days, and to pay us five dollars each per day for every day we were more than sixty, if any, on the journey."

Initially, about 100 men signed on, some for a reduced fee in exchange for the promise of work on the trail. They sailed in late April for Port Lavaca via Havana, New Orleans, and Galveston. French himself was not aboard. An associate, North West, took charge of this group while French stayed behind signing up more men. He was also still completing arrangements for the journey. The first sailing of 100 men got to Port Lavaca on or about May 9. There they discovered that there were neither the mules French had promised would be waiting, nor any wagons for the absent mules to pull. They made camp and waited in growing fear and anger.

In New York French signed up many more paying customers from a new office on Wall Street. He acquired some wagons (from Dan Rice's circus), cases of rifles, and other gear. It was all loaded along with "as much gold ... as two men could carry ..." aboard the steamer Georgia which finally sailed on May 13. The government had delayed the departure for a week to search the ship seeking evidence of connections to a suspected forthcoming attack on Cuba led by López, which, in fact, occurred the same day French and his group arrived at Havana harbor.

A delay at Havana, including a change of ships and a threatened search consequent of suspicions of French's connection to the López filibuster, resulted in missing their ship connection in New Orleans. This meant a further delay of nearly a week. French put the men up in the best hotels available and all lived well in New Orleans – on French – as the month of May ended. On June 4, French and the additional recruits arrived at Port Lavaca. Those stranded there for nearly a month greeted him with a mixture of relief and fury. When the new arrivals discovered the absence of mules, they, too, became much concerned. French, often described as remarkably persuasive, convinced the crowd that all would be well. He purchased young and unbroken mules somewhere, and, after much more delay, they finally made it to San Antonio via Victoria on July 6. There, as he had in Victoria, French produced such papers as military orders, bank drafts, and an unlimited line of credit drawn on Howland and Aspinwell, a major New York shipping firm. All of it was bogus. He refurbished, re-supplied, bought horses, cattle, and many, better, mules. New recruits signed up. The train of 33 colorful, individually named wagons left San Antonio with much fanfare in mid-July. The sixty days promised for the entire trip had expired and San Diego was still 1,500 miles away.

=== End of the expedition ===
A month later in the Trans-Pecos they caught up with a wagon train carrying military supplies. French bought a number of the wagons and mules from the owner, Ben Franklin Coons, for a promised payment of nearly $18,000. French arrived in El Paso a couple of days ahead of his wagon train, which finally got there on September 18. The men of the expedition found him making more big purchases and living it up. But a frontiersman named Henry Skillman, riding hard out of San Antonio, reached El Paso near midnight the next day; time had run out for all of them. Skillman had a letter from the shipping firm disavowing any claims against it, letters from merchants French had defrauded, and a warrant for French's arrest.

French and a few others, including North West, who had been in charge of the first sailing, fled into Mexico. The men of the expedition divided what they could salvage, raised what cash they could, divided into groups, and headed either west or back home. Some followed the planned route to San Diego, while others made their way to Mazatlan and other Gulf of California ports. Most were on foot and all suffered considerable hardships. The first to arrive in San Francisco made it there in mid-December.

=== Gunfight at Corralitos ===
About three weeks after escaping the law, French led a dozen mounted men into a camp near Corralitos, Chihuahua, Mexico, where eight former expedition members had made their way from El Paso. The seven known accounts of what happened there on October 9, 1850, vary substantially. In the ensuing gunfight, two men died and three more were seriously wounded. One of those was French. Whoever shot him wanted him dead, but as it happened, the gunshot only cost him his right arm. The rifle ball struck at or near French's wrist and passed through his forearm before exiting above the elbow. The gunman may have been John Holmes, who later said, "My blood boiled, and snatching my rifle from my son's hands, without taking aim I shot French." However, Holmes was not the only one who shot at French. David Cooper recalled, "I let drive at him, aiming to shoot him in the heart." But Cooper claimed he stumbled on a rope tugged by a mule, which threw off his aim. A third man, Daniel Wright, had already attacked French with a Bowie knife, and the two were fighting in the dirt when Cooper or Holmes shot him.

At about the same instant that French was wounded, someone shot and killed Wright. Some say that "Ramrod" Harris, the "wickedest man in the West," walked up to French and Wright, looked at them struggling in the dust, and fired his shotgun point blank into Daniel Wright's neck, killing him and destroying French's right arm. However, an American mine superintendent who claimed to have treated French's arm, packed the wound with charcoal, and bandaged it with bed sheets, did not mention buckshot in the wound. It is probable that Cooper or Holmes shot Parker French, and it was French who shot Wright as they fought. Expedition member William Nelson was shot in the back and killed in the fighting, and both Cooper and Holmes were seriously wounded, Cooper with a shot through the thigh and Holmes losing both his arms.

== Durango, San Luis Obispo, Sacramento, 1850–54 ==
The men who stayed with French took him to Chihuahua where a surgeon completed the amputation of French's infected right arm, removing it near the shoulder. French lingered there recovering for several weeks. Once back on his feet, he went to Durango and approached the governor of the state with a proposal to establish an American colony on the Gila, with the benefit of providing protection for the locals from Indian attacks. The governor was interested and planned to raise $600,000 for the project, only to cancel it when Ben Coons came to town from El Paso and told of French's swindles. Coons, bankrupted in part due to French, was on his way to San Francisco to borrow money from his brother. By December, French was in Mazatlan where he encountered several former members of his expedition. There, according to one, he helped a number of men get passage to San Francisco. According to another he managed to con some of the men again. He re-organized his gang, acquired weapons, and took to the mountains intending to rob a government silver train. They didn't manage that, but did rob some ranchers and travelers. By February he was in a gunfight with Mexican troops, which resulted in the death of North West. French was captured and jailed in Durango where he remained for about 18 months.

In July 1852 he was released and made his way back to Mazatlan. There he boarded a brig called the Hallowell, San Francisco bound. The Hallowell was unable to resupply in Mazatlan and, on the morning of August 18, after 47 days of unfavorable wind out of Panama, somewhere off the coast of Baja, with its food stores nearly exhausted, a lookout sighted a clipper ship, the North America. The owner and captain, John Noyes, signaled distress, flying the ensign at half-mast and union-down. Noyes boarded the North America. "Captain" Parker H. French accompanied him. Captain Artell Austin provided Noyes with twelve days provisions but refused French's offer of $40 to join the passengers aboard his ship.

Things continued badly for the brig. Early in September, after more than two weeks of beating along the coast, Noyes put in at Cave Landing, on San Luis Bay, in San Luis Obispo County, California, again seeking provision. This was not by any means a regular port-of-call. There was no wharf, no dock. No matter, everyone but Noyes abandoned ship. French, a notorious criminal, found himself broke, friendless, and carrying all he owned in a remote, scarcely populated "cow county."

But by January, the land-grant dons who ran the county had appointed the smooth talking French as their District Attorney at $500 a year. That fall he was elected overwhelmingly to represent the county in the State Legislature. He sailed to New York and collected Lucretia and his daughter, returning with them to the Bay Area at the end of 1853. He served one term as an Assemblyman, serving on the Ways and Means Committee.

== A Nicaraguan filibuster, many scams and a sad end ==
He launched a Sacramento newspaper, was shot in a bar (in the leg), and decked a former governor in a fistfight, in spite of being a very short, slight, one-armed man. He practiced law with a fellow member of the 1854 legislature and others. The legislator was a Whig from San Jose named Freeman Shanks McKinney. McKinney was executed while serving in Henry A. Crabb's Mexican filibuster. Two of French's cases were heard by the State Supreme Court, one, with McKinney, was a successful land dispute against James Lick, the other an unsuccessful attempt with Frederick Hall to make San Jose the state capital. He left the newspaper in other hands the same year, 1855, to join William Walker in Walker's doomed Nicaraguan filibuster. In Nicaragua he promoted himself from Captain to Colonel and served as "Minister of Hacienda," which amounted to being Secretary of the Treasury. Walker appointed him Minister Plenipotentiary to the United States, but President Pierce refused his credentials. This did not prevent him from living for months in luxury hotel suites and entertaining the press and politicians with cigars and champagne.

After some legal problems relating to recruiting volunteers for the Nicaraguan filibuster, he returned to Nicaragua in March 1856, only to be sent away by Walker. Things then started gradually to unravel for Parker French. He lectured on Walker, purporting to raise money for him. He was in Minnesota with his family for a few months in 1856, buying and then selling at least one newspaper and promoting a land development scheme. Christopher Columbus Andrews discovered French in October 1856 living at a stagecoach inn at Watab, Minnesota: "Mr. French came to Watab a few week ago with a company of mechanics, and has been rushing the place ahead with great zeal. He appears to make a good impression on the people of the town." A wealthy Bostonian reported that French cheated him in a deal involving the selling of two ships to the Navy. There was some unsavory business connected to ginseng. He launched a "Black Republican" (anti-slavery) paper in San Francisco that died after three issues in 1857. In 1860 French got into trouble in New Orleans over a fake opium shipment.

During the American Civil War French took on the personas of three different men, playing three separate roles. As Parker French he was interested in the Knights of the Golden Circle. As alias Carlyle Murray he was a poet, dreamer and dealer in munitions for the Rebels. As alias Charles Maxey he was involved in a confederate spy ring, which included the famed Rose Greenhow. Maxey was thought to be a spiritualist, an opium eater, or a maniac. He is quoted as saying that his room was "crowded with the souls of those that lived in other days." French was arrested by federal authorities in Connecticut and imprisoned in Fort Warren in Boston on charges of spying for the Confederacy. After an extensive investigation with considerable circumstantial evidence implicating French as a Knight of the Golden Circle and a Confederate agent the investigating officer recommended that French should be released; no definitive case of spying or treason could be mounted.

French was living in Washington, D.C., by 1863, where he registered for the Civil War draft in July, describing himself as a 40-year-old lawyer with only one arm. For prior military service, he gave "2 years in Mexico". Throughout the Civil War he operated as both a lawyer and a purveyor for Union troops (he defrauded a partner), first in Virginia in support of the Army of the Potomac and then in Tennessee in support of both the Chattanooga campaign and the advance through Atlanta to the sea.

He is listed in the 1865 directory of Louisville, Kentucky, residing on the east side of 6th, between Chestnut and Broadway, operating as a peddler. After moving back to St Louis, French again defrauded partners in a steamboat venture moving supplies to Fort Benton Montana. French appears in the 1870 census in New York after his wife Lucretia died in 1869. He was remarried to Rebecca Claggett in 1875 with whom he had a namesake son, Parker Hardin French Jr.

According to McGowan, who saw him in D.C. in the 1870s, he "appeared to be a perfect wreck of his former self," drinking himself to death with cocktails of whiskey and chloroform. French died early in the morning of June 19, 1878, after becoming extremely ill with very painful "congestion and sepsis of the lungs and stomach." The New York Herald, in a simple entry with no remembrance, family comments or notice of arrangements: "Died French—June 19, Colonel P.H. French."

When French died in 1878, his death went generally unnoticed. Newspapers had reported the death of French before—at least five separate times. He had been twice killed in gunfights, twice executed in Mexico—once by a firing squad, once by hanging—and once killed in Nicaragua. Acquaintances thought he might have drunk himself to death. For a while, there was a lapse of interesting press reports, so many just presumed that he was already dead and were surprised when he was not. Some pondered his many misadventures and wondered how he escaped retribution from a hangman, a firing squad, or an irate victim. Though a notorious scoundrel in his time, notably from 1850 to 1862, French has been relegated to a minor footnote in antebellum America and Civil War history.

== Sources ==
- Baylor, George Wythe, edited and with an Introduction by Jerry D. Thompson, Into the Far, Wild Country: True Tales of the Old Southwest, Texas Western Press, The University of Texas at El Paso: 1996.
- Bell, Horace, Reminiscences of a Ranger: Early Times in Southern California, University of Oklahoma Press, Norman: 1999. Originally published by Yarnell, Caystile & Mathes printers, Los Angeles: 1881. Bell's recollections, while useful, are not trustworthy.
- Carr, Albert Z., The World and William Walker, Harper & Row, New York: 1963.
- Chaffin, Tom, Fatal Glory: Narciso López and the First Clandestine U.S. War Against Cuba, Louisiana State University Press, Baton Rouge: 1996.
- Dando-Collins, Stephen, Tycoon's War: How Cornelius Vanderbilt Invaded a Country to Overthrow America's Most Famous Military Adventurer, Da Capo Press, Philadelphia: 2008. This readable account contains numerous errors regarding French.
- Ellis, George, papers in the Kathleen Flanigan Collection of the San Diego Historical Society: MS 272, Bulk Dates: 1982–2003
- Goodbody, Emmet Joseph (Joe), Kentucky Barracuda: Parker Hardin French (1826–1878), Mascot Books, Herndon: 2018
- Harris, Sheldon, "The Public Career of John Louis O'Sullivan," unpublished dissertation, Columbia University, 1958.
- May, Robert E., Manifest Destiny's Underworld: Filibustering in Antebellum America, University of North Carolina Press, Chapel Hill: 2002.
- Quinn, Arthur, The Rivals: William Gwin, David Broderick, and the Birth of California, University of Nebraska Press, Lincoln: 1994. Recommended.
- Steele, Andrew, Diary of a Journey to California, unpublished typescript held by the Abraham Lincoln Presidential Library, Springfield, Illinois.
- Stiles, Samuel, unpublished narrative held by Wayne Tyson of San Diego, California.
- www.parkerhfrench.com
- Tucker, Albert B., "The Parker H. French Expedition Through Southwest Texas in 1850," The Journal of Big Bend Studies, Vol. 6, 1994.
- Walker, William, The War in Nicaragua, Mobile, AL: 1860.
- Whitcomb, A. C., William M. Stafford, Freeman S. McKinney, and Parker H. French, plaintiffs and respondents, vs. James Lick and Jean Ducau, defendants and appellants. Brief on behalf of appellants, Town and Bacon, San Francisco, 1857?

Additional newspaper reports

- New Orleans Daily Picayune, May 22 and 26, June 6, 1850, July 25, November 8, 1856.
- New York Times, February 19 & October 12, 1852; December 14, 15, 17, 18, & 26 1855, January 10, 14, 18 & 19, February 7, 8, 9 & 27, April 25, May 17 & 20, June 3, 1856, March 19, 1859, February 22, 1862.
- Sacramento Daily Democratic State Journal, January 1855 to August 1855.
- Sacramento Daily Union, January 2, 1854.
- San Francisco Bulletin, May 12, 1857.
- San Francisco Daily Alta California, February 28, 1851, December 5 and 17, 1851, July 20, 1854, October 21, 1855, December 5, 1861, and October 16, 1862.
- The Texian Advocate, Victoria, Texas, May 15, 1851.
- Washington (DC) Daily Globe, July 6, 1857.
