= Caborca Municipality =

Coordinates: 30.7841°N 112.5180°W

Caborca
- Municipality
- Coat of arms

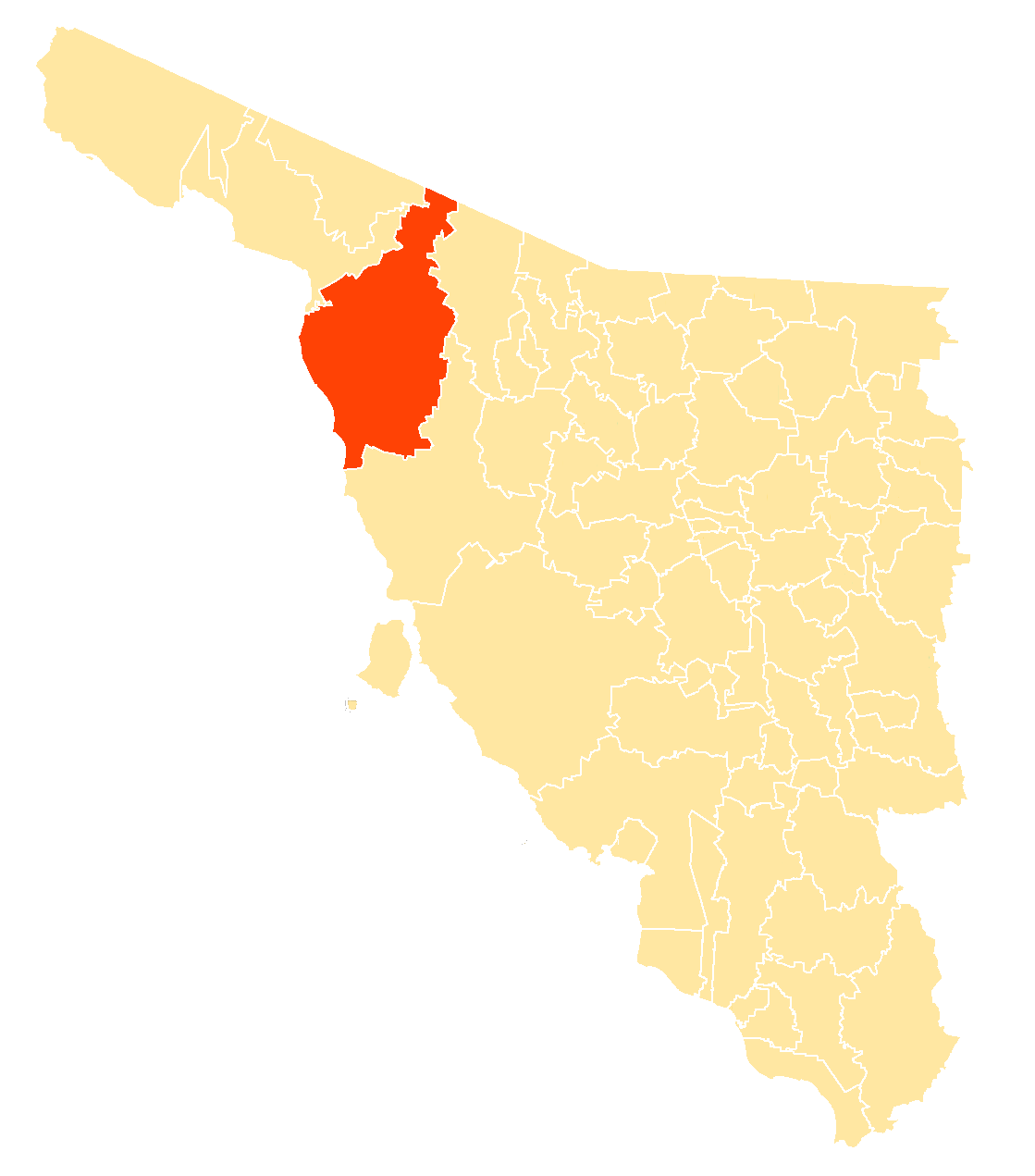
- Location of the municipality in Sonora
- Country: Mexico
- State: Sonora
- Municipal Seat: Caborca

Area
  - Total: 10,721.84 km^{2} (4,139.73 sq mi)

Population (2020)
  - Total: 105,387
  - Density: 8.31/km^{2} (21.5/sq mi)
- Time zone: UTC–07:00 (Zona Pacífico)
- Area code: +52 637

Caborca is a municipality in the state of Sonora in northwestern Mexico.

The area of the municipality is 10,721.84 km^{2}, which is 5.78 percent of the state total.

== Towns and villages ==
Major localities

There are 341 localities in the municipality of Caborca, the largest of which are:

| Name | 2010 Census Population |
|---|---|
| Caborca | 59,922 |
| Plutarco Elías Calles (La Y Griega) | 3,725 |
| El Diamante (La Retranca) | 3,374 |
| El Coyote | 1,337 |
| Siempre Viva | 815 |
| Poblado San Felipe | 767 |
| Desemboque | 733 |
| Álvaro Obregó | 707 |
| Adolfo Oribe de Alva | 659 |
| La Almita | 644 |
| Último Esfuerzo | 592 |
| La Alameda | 546 |
| José María Morelos | 490 |
| Total Municipality | 81,309 |

Other localities include: Josefa Ortiz de Domínguez, 15 de Septiembre, Santa Eduwiges, Viñedo Viva, Ures, Rodolfo Campodónico, Poblado Cerro Blanco, Puerto Lobos, San Francisquito.
