= 1857 United States Senate special election in California =

- January 13, 1857

Majority vote of both houses needed to win
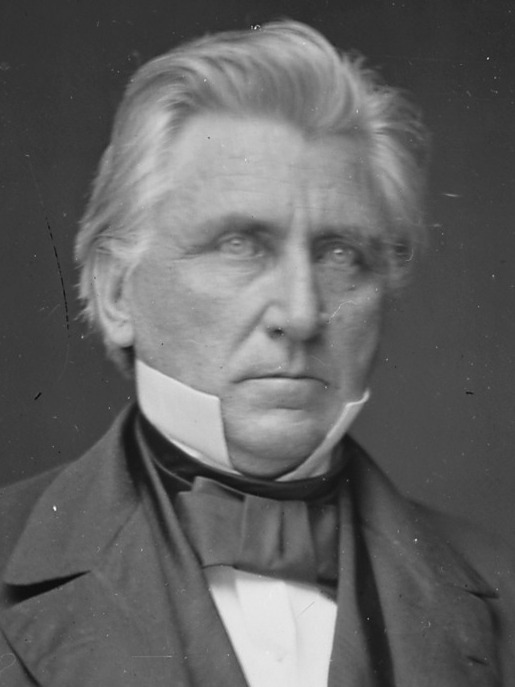

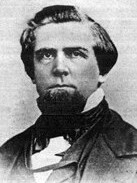

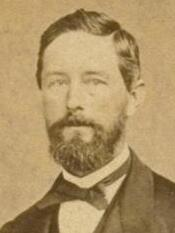
Nominee	William M. Gwin	Henry A. Crabb	Aaron A. Sargent
Party	Democratic	Know Nothing	Republican
Joint session	82	17	11
Percentage	72.57%	15.04%	9.73%
Senator before election
None
(Legislature failed to elect)
Elected Senator
William M. Gwin
Democratic

The 1857 United States Senate special election in California was held on January 13, 1857, by the California State Legislature to elect a U.S. senator (Class 3) to represent the State of California in the United States Senate. Legislators had previously attempted to elect a Senator in 1855, but could not reach a majority for a single candidate. In a special joint session, former Democratic Senator William M. Gwin was re-elected over Know Nothing State Senator Henry A. Crabb and Republican Nevada County District Attorney Aaron A. Sargent.

== Results ==
Election in the Legislature (joint session)
Party	Candidate	Votes	%
Democratic	William M. Gwin	82	72.57%
Know Nothing	Henry A. Crabb	17	15.04%
Republican	Aaron A. Sargent	11	9.73%
Republican	Edward Stanly	2	1.77%
	Scattering	1	0.88%
Total votes		113	100.00%
