= Henry A. Crabb =

American politician and filibuster

Henry Alexander Crabb
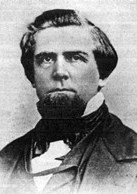
- Born: 1822 or 1824; Nashville, Tennessee, U.S.
- Died: April 7, 1857 (aged 35 or 37); Caborca, Sonora, Mexico
- Cause of death: Execution by firing squad
- Spouse: Filomena Ainsa
- Military career
- Allegiance: United States
- Branch: Filibuster Army
- Unit: Arizona Colonization Company
- Conflicts: Reform War: Battle of Caborca (executed)

Henry Alexander Crabb (died April 7, 1857) was an American soldier from Tennessee and Mississippi, and an early member of the California State Senate, who served during a term ending in 1854. He is famous for coming to an ignominious end as a filibuster (freelance colonizer), when he was killed by Mexican troops who reportedly sent his severed head to the capital city preserved in a barrel of wine.

== Biography ==
He was a leader of the Whig party and was known as a pro-slavery activist. Crabb was originally from Tennessee. His father was a lawyer and a judge, Henry A. Crabb Sr. He moved to Vicksburg, Mississippi in 1844 where he worked as a lawyer. He killed Edward Jenkins, editor of the Vicksburg Whig newspaper, in a street fight. Jenkins apparently pulled a knife and stabbed Crabb several times, in response to which Crabb pulled out a gun and fatally shot Jenkins in the heart.

Crabb also married Filomena Ainsa and had two children with her. Crabb was an unsuccessful candidate for the United States Senate on the Know Nothing party ticket in 1857. After losing, he organized a filibustering expedition to the Mexican state of Sonora to aid the Liberal rebels in Mexico's ongoing Reform War, specifically the leader of the Liberals in Sonora, Ignacio Pesqueira. After Crabb crossed the border, however, Pesqueira turned on him, and Crabb's forces were defeated in an eight-day battle at Caborca in April 1857. The survivors, including Crabb, were captured and then executed in what has been termed the Crabb massacre. According to one report in a Mississippi newspaper, "his head was preserved in spirits of wine and sent to the city of Mexico." Other accounts claim it was mezcal.

== Sources ==
- Henry A. Crabb, Filibuster, and the San Diego Herald – The Journal of San Diego History, Winter 1973, Volume 19, Number 1
