= Henry Crabb (judge) =

American judge (1793–1827)

- Born: October 1793; Botetourt County, Virginia
- Died: November 28, 1827 (aged 34); Davidson County, Tennessee

Henry Crabb (October 1793 – November 28, 1827) was an American lawyer and judge. He served as the U.S. Attorney for the Western District of Tennessee, and as a justice of the Tennessee Supreme Court from 1826 to 1827. He seemingly had a good reputation as a lawyer but due to his death at a relatively young age he only appears briefly in biographical histories of antebellum law and lawyers.

== Early life, education, and career ==
Born in Botetourt County, Virginia, Crabb was the son of Colonel Ralph Crabb, and the brother of George Whitfield Crabb. The family seems to have migrated to middle Tennessee together, and in 1813 Crabb was admitted to the bar of Davidson County in company with Ephraim H. Foster and James Trimble. In 1816 he announced that his new Nashville office was in "small new building on Cedar street, a short distance below the Messrs. Sitter's copper-smith shop, and not far from the public square," and that he also practiced in Bedford, Rutherford, and Lincoln counties.

In 1816 he served as secretary to a political convention creating a statement of grievance regarding the terms of a recent treaty with the Cherokee. Crabb was listed as one of the directors of the Nashville Library in 1818, along with Robert Searcy, Wilkins Tannehill, Duncan Robertson, Elihu S. Hall, James Roane, and James Trimble. In 1819 he was part of a welcoming committee for James Monroe's visit to Nashville, along with city mayor Foster, John McNairy, John H. Eaton, J. C. Bronaugh, John Somerville, W. B. Lewis, Samuel Hogg, Felix Grundy, O. B. Hayes, and Alfred Balch. The same year there was a financial panic, as the Farmers and Mechanics Bank suspended specie payments, but Crabb, Thomas Ramsey, and John P. Erwin "investigated the Farmers and Mechanics Bank, and assured the people if they would give their confidence it could and would resume payment."

== Appointments and offices ==
Crabb was appointed United States Attorney for the Western District of Tennessee in 1818, serving until 1827. The appointee to the corresponding U.S. Marshal position was John Childress. Little has been written about his law career except by Henry S. Foote of Mississippi who characterized Crabb as cool and reserved to the point of appearing grave, quietly sarcastic, and devoted to reason. His Nashville bar association obituary gave him many laurels, describing him as having "talents of the highest order...a clear, discriminating mind, sound judgment, strong memory, and uncommonly correct views and opinions...[a] profound, learned and able lawyer...The utmost confidence was reposed in his talents, learning and inflexible integrity." In 1820 he was appointed along with Foster to be an aide-de-camp to general William Carroll of the Tennessee state militia. In 1822 the same two were promoted to colonelcy under the same general officer. In 1823 Crabb resigned his militia office and was replaced by James K. Polk of Columbia, Tennessee. In January 1824 he was one of several candidates being considered for the appointment of U.S. minister to Mexico.

Crabb became law partners with John Bell in 1822. Crabb announced in 1823 that he had "removed from the south-field into town" and had moved into the "small white office" at Cedar and Cherry streets. Crabb was listed as one of the trustees of Cumberland College in 1823. He apparently served on the board of Cumberland College and University of Nashville (predecessor of George Peabody College) from 1816 until death. He was also a long-serving trustee of the Nashville Female Academy. As of 1821 he served on the board of a Nashville bank with Thomas Crutcher, John Overton, Robert Farquharson, John P. Erwin, Jacob McGavock, John C. McLemore, and Robert Woods.

In 1823 he also traveled by ship either from Virginia to Havana to New Orleans, or directly from Havana to New Orleans, on board the schooner Princess along with a cargo of tropical groceries including sugar, plantains, coffee, "binnanoes," and 10,000 oranges. He was listed on the passenger manifest as a 29-year-old attorney-at-law, native to the United States and 6 ft 2 in (1.88 m) in height. He may have had business dealings in Natchez, Mississippi as there was mail waiting for him there in July 1823. In April 1825 his father-in-law listed for sale Crabb's plantation of 90 acres, located on the Cumberland River about 10 miles above Nashville. Payment would be accepted in either "cash or negroes." In October 1825 he placed a runway slave ad in the Nashville Whig seeking the return of an enslaved man named Elijah, age 35, who had a scar on his head.

As of January 1826, the federal judiciary officers of West Tennessee (now Middle Tennessee) were judge McNairy, attorney Crabb, marshal Robert Purdy, and clerk Nathaniel A. McNairy (brother of judge John). Crabb was elected in December 1826 to fill a vacancy on the Tennessee Supreme Court caused by the death of John Haywood. At the time of his appointment, the National Banner and Nashville Whig wrote that "No appointment, we venture to say, could have given more universal satisfaction." At the time of his appointment his law partner was David Barrow, his brother-in-law. He served until his death the following year. In 1942 the Tennessee Law Review stated, "The opinions of Judge Crabb during his short tenure are reported in Martin and Yerger's Reports, the most noted, perhaps, being upon the question, how far an attorney in Tennessee was entitled to claim pecuniary remuneration for professional services rendered, on the basis of quantum meruit. His opinions were too few to afford a basis for a just or adequate appraisal."

== Personal life and death ==
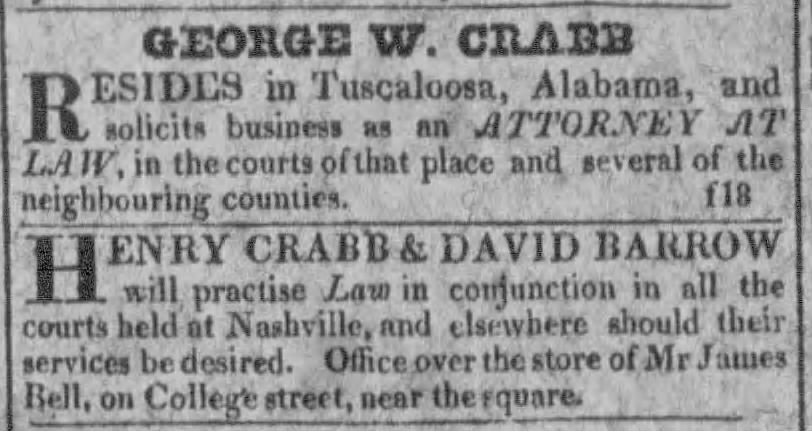
George W. Crabb, Henry Crabb, and David Barrow advertisements, Nashville Republican Banner, July 26, 1826

His obituary described his death as a "severe and unexpected loss," but a later account suggests that he was already in "a state of rapid physical decline" at the time of his appointment. His will was written in March 1826, at which time he owned a plantation in Louisiana and a house in "Southfield." He wrote that, "I owe more debts than I ever intended to owe," and named John Bell (his old law partner), Francis B. Fogg, David Barrow (his law partner), and his wife Jane Crabb to be the executors of his estate. Crabb's Louisiana property may have been in Iberville Parish. Barrow listed for sale Crabb's collection of law books in January 1828. Following Crabb's death, his seat remained vacant until the court was reconfigured in 1831. The year following his death, Crabb's memory was toasted by one S. Owens at a Nashville dinner honoring Thomas Hinds.

Crabb was married to Jane Barrow, who was the daughter of Willie Barrow of North Carolina and Jane Green of Kentucky, and a sister of U.S. Senator from Louisiana Alexander Barrow. Congressman Washington Barrow and Republic of Texas Navy midshipman and U.S. Indian agent John E. Barrow were her half-brothers. They had three children together: Henry A. Crabb, Jane Ann Crabb, and Mary Eleanor Crabb. Mary Eleanor Crabb married Robert J. Barrow, a son of Bennett Barrow, and they lived together at Rosebank Plantation in West Feliciana Parish. Henry A. Crabb, sometimes called Col. Crabb, was an early settler of California and was executed by a Mexican–O'odham firing squad following a failed filibuster expedition to Sonora in 1857.

== Sources ==
- Carey, Bill (2018). Runaways, Coffles and Fancy Girls: A History of Slavery in Tennessee. Nashville, Tennessee: Clearbrook Press. ISBN 978-0-9725680-4-3. LCCN 2018903570. OCLC 1045068878.
- Williams, Samuel (April 1942). "Dim Figures in Our Appellate Judiciary". Tennessee Law Review. 17 (3). ISSN 0040-3288.

Political offices
Preceded by John Haywood	Justice of the Tennessee Supreme Court; 1826–1827	Succeeded by Court reconfigured
