= Marbella Corella =

Mexican singer (born 1988)

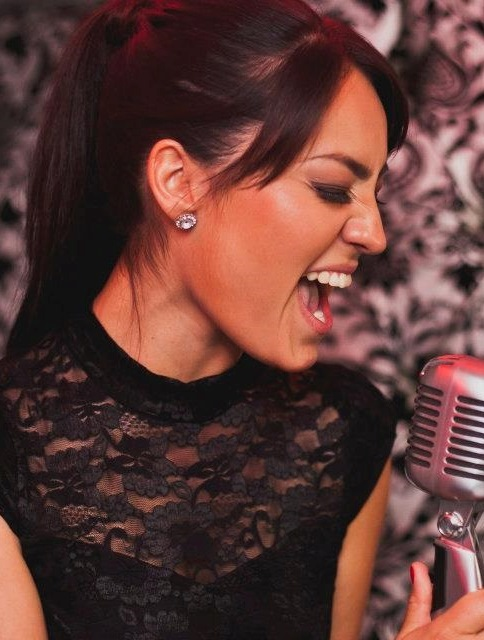

Background information
- Also known as: Marbella Corella
- Born: Beatriz Marbella Corella Sías; 14 September 1988 (age 38)
- Origin: Caborca, Sonora, Mexico
- Genres: Latin; regional Mexican
- Instruments: Vocals
- Label: Warner

Beatriz Marbella Corella Sías (born September 14, 1988), better known as Marbella Corella, is a Mexican singer who gained fame by coming 3rd place in the hit reality show La Academia.

After spending six months in reality, recipient of third place in the competition was, winning prize of $500, 000.00, and a recording contract with Warner Music. In 2007 launched "Mírame" her first solo album, which collected many of the songs performed at La Academia, plus a DVD of the same; and soon managed to sell more than 30,000 copies in Mexico production and placing in the top 50 of the best selling albums in the country, according to AMPROFON.

In December 2014, she released the single "La que miente en tu cara".

== Biography ==
In 2006, she was selected for the Mexican musical reality TV show La Academia. During this show she sang "Sin él", "Si quieres verme llorar", "Lagrimas y lluvia" and other songs.

== Discography ==
=== Studio albums ===
- Mírame (2007)

=== Compilations ===
- La Academia Cinco: Vol. 1
- La Academia Cinco: Vol. 2

=== Collaborations ===
- La Academia le canta a José Alfredo Jiménez – "Un pedazo de luna"
