= Caborca =

Heroica Caborca
- City
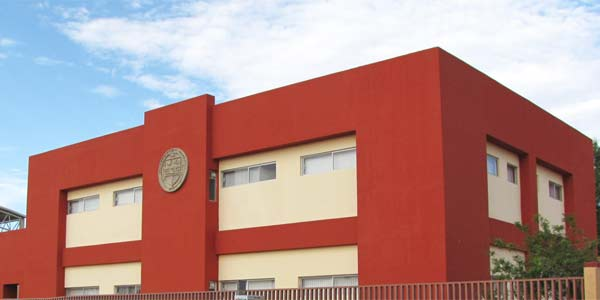
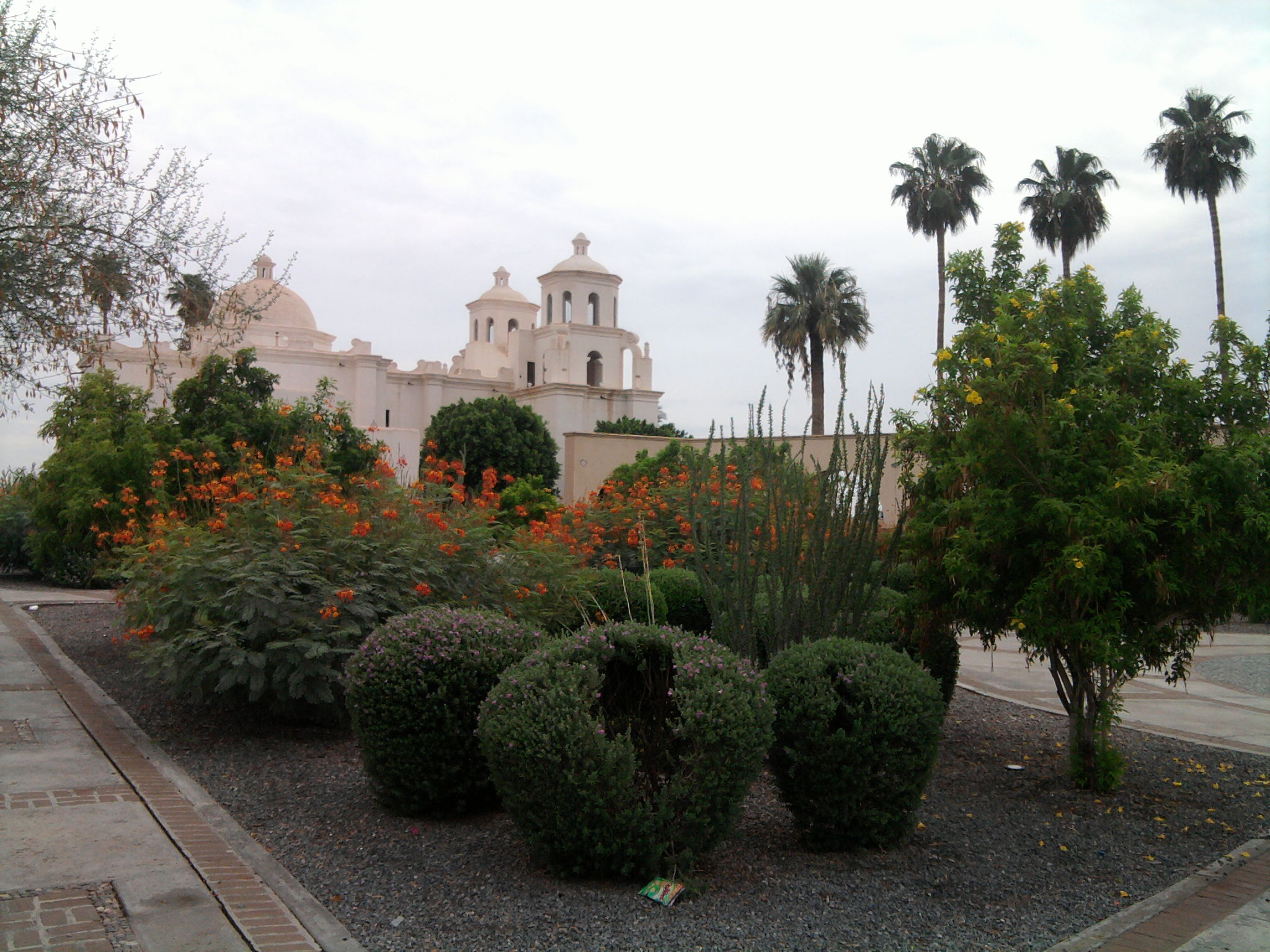
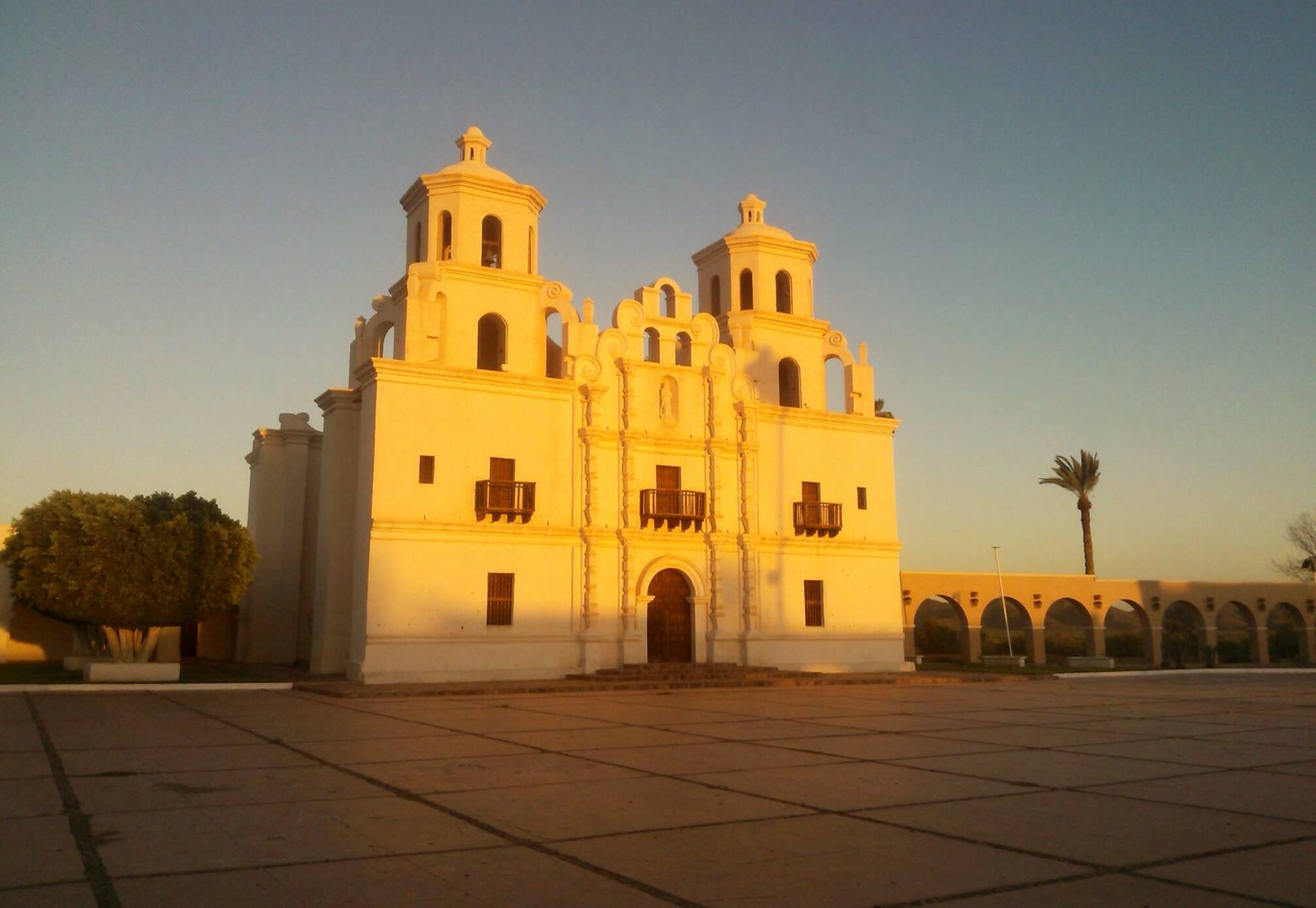
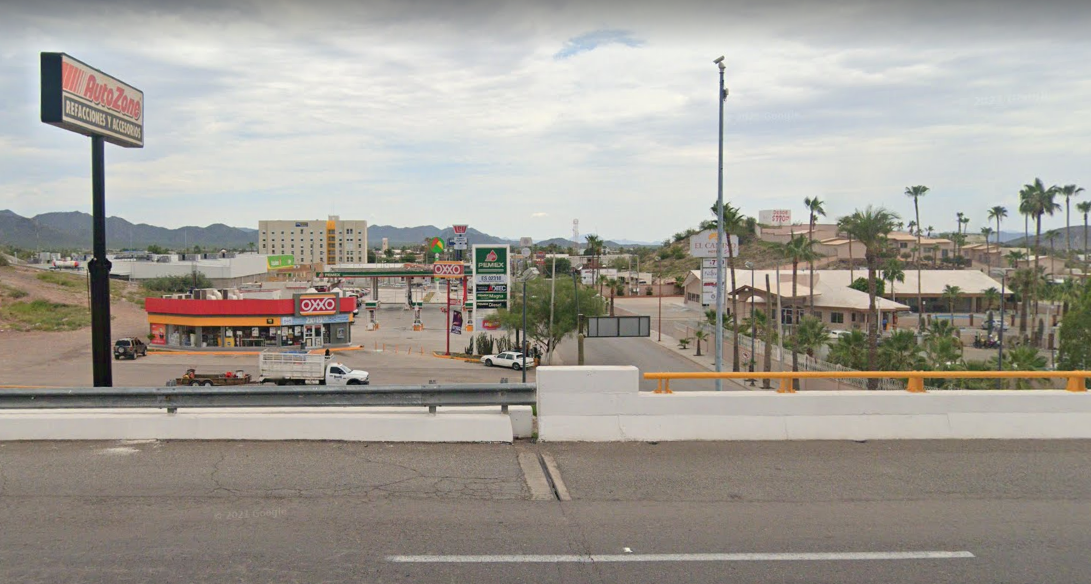
- The historic temple of the Immaculate Conception of Our Lady of Caborca, the garden of the Pueblo Viejo square, the University of Sonora Caborca campus and also a view of one of the commercial areas of the city.

- Seal
- Nickname: La Perla del Desierto
- Location within Sonora Location within Mexico
- Coordinates: 30°43′N 112°09′W
- Country: Mexico
- State: Sonora
- Municipality: Caborca Municipality
- Foundation: 1693

Government
  - Type: Ayuntamiento
  - Municipal President: Abraham David Mier Nogales
- Elevation: 280 m (920 ft)

Population (2020)
  - Total: 67,604
  - Demonym: Caborquense
- Time zone: UTC–07:00 (Zona Pacífico)
- Postal code: 83600
- Area code: +52 637
- Website: https://www.caborcasonora.gob.mx/

Caborca is the municipal seat of the Caborca Municipality in the Mexican state of Sonora. The city has a population of 67,604, while the municipal population was 89,122 as of 2020.

== History ==
The Hohokam inhabited the area from roughly 300 B.C. to 1400 A.D.

The municipal seat was formed in the year 1688 as Misión La Purísima Concepción de Nuestra Señora de Caborca, by the Jesuit missionary Francisco Eusebio Kino on the point called Caborca Viejo (Old Caborca). The mission town was completed under Kino in December 1692. The old site of the municipal seat is now known as Pueblo Viejo (Old Town).

In 1790, the seat was established at the place it now occupies, on the eastern bank of the Asunción River. It was inhabited by Upper Pimas. The name of the municipality comes from "Kawulk", which means "hill with rocks and boulders".

In April 1857, during the Reform War, a force of American colonists, captained by Henry A. Crabb, was defeated and massacred by rebel forces of Ygnacio Pesquiera and Tohono O'odham warriors. Pesquiera had initially invited the Americans to settle in northern Sonora, to help the fight against the federal Mexican government; however, before the Crabb Expedition arrived in Sonora, Pesquiera's rebels defeated the federal troops and took over the state. Because of this, when the Crabb party arrived, Pesquiera's ordered his men to attack the Americans. Over the course of eight days, from 1 to 8 April, about 25 Americans and a reported 200 Mexicans and O'odham were killed in battle, at the end of which, some 55 captured Americans were executed by firing squad, including Henry Crabb. In memory of the Crabb Massacre, the seat changed its name to Heróica Caborca in April 1948.

At the start of Mexican independence, it was the seat of a parish, under the area of Guadalupe de Altar for its civil administration. It obtained the status of Municipality at the end of the 19th century, assigned to the District of Altar (until districts were abolished by the constitution of 1917).

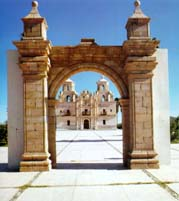
Caborca Mission

== Chronology ==
- 1693 Foundation of Caborca by the missionary Eusebio Francisco Kino.
- 1695 On 2 April, missionary Francisco Javier Saeta was assassinated by rebel Indians from Tubutama, Oquitoa and Santa Teresa.
- 1751 Pima rebels set fire to the valley, Father Tomás Tello died in the revolt.
- 1790 The Franciscan friars move the mission from Cerro Prieto to the current place where the church is.
- 1803 The construction of the temple begins.
- 1857 Defeat of filibuster invasion.
- 1867 Flooding of the Asunción river causes total loss of the town.
- 1872 Relocation of the town to its present location, traced by Domingo Quiroz y Mora.
- 1933 Ascends to villa category.
- 1948 The title of the city is granted.

== Demography ==
According to data from the Population and Housing Census carried out in 2020 by the National Institute of Statistics and Geography (INEGI), the city has a total of 67,604 inhabitants, of which 33,463 are men and 34,141 are women. In 2020 there were 25,377 houses, but of these 20,460 houses were inhabited, of which 7,314 were under the charge of a woman. Of the total inhabitants, 189 people over 3 years of age (0.28% of the total) speak an indigenous language; while 606 inhabitants (0.93%) consider themselves Afro-Mexicans or Afro-descendants.

79.93% of its inhabitants belong to the Catholic religion, 9.23% are Evangelical/Protestant Christian or of some variant, 0.03% profess another religion, while 10.61% do not profess any religion.

== Geography ==
Municipal boundaries are with Pima County, Arizona, in the United States of America in the north, Altar in the east, Pitiquito in the southeast, Puerto Peñasco and Plutarco Elías Calles in the northwest, and the Gulf of California in the southwest. Caborca lies on Federal Highway 2, which connects the state's capital Hermosillo with the cities of Mexicali and Tijuana in the state of Baja California. The four-lane Hermosillo highway connects the four-lane Santa Ana-Caborca highway.

=== Climate ===
Caborca has a desert climate (Köppen climate classification BWh) with very hot summers and mild winters. The temperatures can climb above 38 °C in May and stay there until October. Because it has a very dry climate, strong winds can bring localized dust storms as well as "dust devils". Although rain is rare, when it happens it can bring a sudden deluge that causes brief localized flooding. Like the U.S. state of Arizona to the north, the area has a monsoon season in late summer that brings higher humidity and frequent dust storms or rain showers.

Climate data for Heroica Caborca, Sonora (1951–2010, extremes (1950–2010)
Month	Jan	Feb	Mar	Apr	May	Jun	Jul	Aug	Sep	Oct	Nov	Dec	Year
Record high °C (°F)	31.0 (87.8)	34.0 (93.2)	40.0 (104.0)	40.0 (104.0)	45.0 (113.0)	48.0 (118.4)	46.5 (115.7)	46.0 (114.8)	44.0 (111.2)	43.5 (110.3)	35.0 (95.0)	30.0 (86.0)	48.0 (118.4)
Mean daily maximum °C (°F)	21.1 (70.0)	22.4 (72.3)	25.3 (77.5)	29.5 (85.1)	35.4 (95.7)	40.0 (104.0)	40.4 (104.7)	39.0 (102.2)	38.0 (100.4)	32.3 (90.1)	25.5 (77.9)	21.2 (70.2)	30.8 (87.4)
Daily mean °C (°F)	13.1 (55.6)	14.1 (57.4)	16.6 (61.9)	20.0 (68.0)	24.7 (76.5)	29.5 (85.1)	32.0 (89.6)	31.1 (88.0)	29.5 (85.1)	23.4 (74.1)	16.9 (62.4)	13.2 (55.8)	22.0 (71.6)
Mean daily minimum °C (°F)	5.2 (41.4)	5.9 (42.6)	7.9 (46.2)	10.4 (50.7)	13.9 (57.0)	19.1 (66.4)	23.6 (74.5)	23.4 (74.1)	21.2 (70.2)	14.5 (58.1)	8.4 (47.1)	5.2 (41.4)	13.2 (55.8)
Record low °C (°F)	−3.5 (25.7)	−3.5 (25.7)	−1.5 (29.3)	2.0 (35.6)	6.0 (42.8)	10.0 (50.0)	15.0 (59.0)	16.0 (60.8)	13.0 (55.4)	5.0 (41.0)	−1.0 (30.2)	−3.5 (25.7)	−3.5 (25.7)
Average precipitation mm (inches)	26.0 (1.02)	12.9 (0.51)	18.1 (0.71)	6.7 (0.26)	1.1 (0.04)	1.5 (0.06)	61.0 (2.40)	72.2 (2.84)	28.2 (1.11)	18.0 (0.71)	22.1 (0.87)	33.4 (1.31)	301.2 (11.86)
Average precipitation days (≥ 0.1 mm)	3.2	2.7	3.1	0.9	0.4	0.4	5.0	5.2	3.0	1.6	1.5	3.8	30.8
Source: Servicio Meteorológico Nacional (Mexico's Meteorogical Service)

== Health and educational infrastructure ==
The city has 2 public hospitals, 3 private clinics and 3 public health centers. The city of Caborca has more than 25 public schools, 7 private schools and 3 universities. The universities that are in Caborca are the University of Sonora (UNISON), the Center for University Studies of New East (CEUNO) and a campus of the National Pedagogical University (UPN). In addition, there are ICATSON, CONALEP and COBACH campuses in the city.

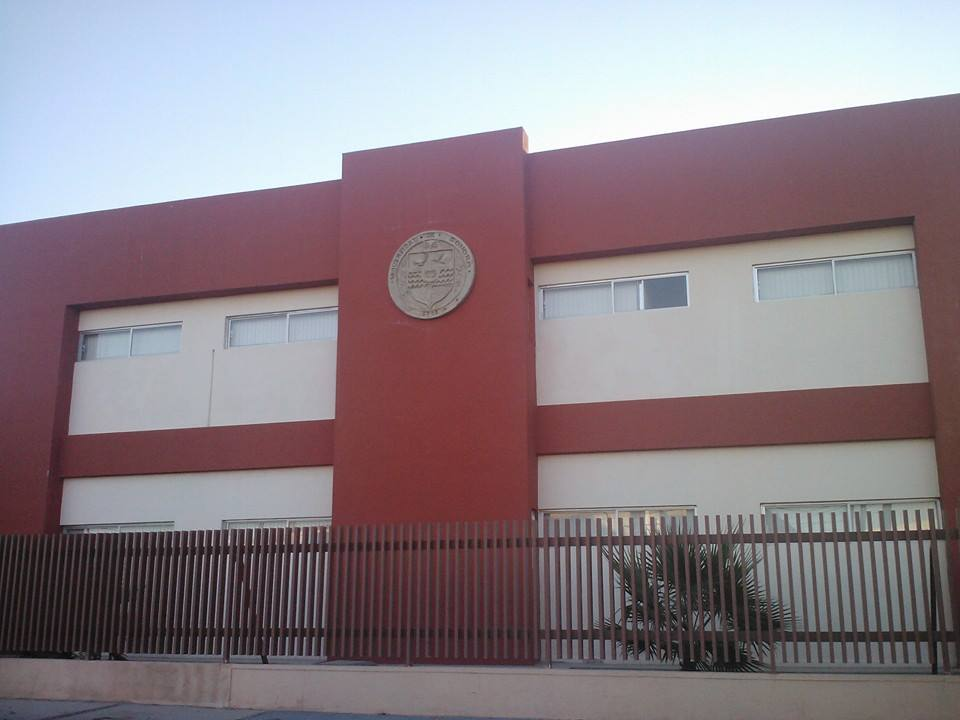
UNISON North Regional Unit.

== Government ==
The seat of the municipal government lies in the city of Heroica Caborca. The governmental exercise falls to the Municipal President, a Trustee, four aldermen of relative majority and two of proportional representation and the cabinet of the President, who is elected every three years.

In addition, the city is the seat of the Local Electoral District III of the state of Sonora, with representation in the Congress of the State of Sonora.

Caborca is also part of the I Federal Electoral District of Sonora of the Chamber of Deputies of the Congress of the Union of Mexico, based in the city of San Luis Río Colorado.

== Economy ==
According to the National Statistical Directory of Economic Units (DENUE) of INEGI, it says that Caborca has more than 4,000 thousand economic units of all kinds such as agriculture, livestock, commerce, mining, construction, manufacturing, postal transport and storage, financial services, accommodation. etc.. Also some of the economic advantages are that in Caborca there are two large solar energy generating plants, there is a station for the freight train in the city and the Puerto Libertad-Sasabe-United States gas pipeline passes nearby, 11 km away from the city of Caborca is the compression station of the gas pipeline and there is an industrial park to the east of the city of Caborca. There is also great economic dynamism due to the Santa Ana-Caborca four-lane highway. Also in Caborca there is coverage of the 4G mobile network. 94% of Caborca has a cell phone. The GDP per capita of Caborca is about 11,000 US dollars.

=== Agriculture ===
Agriculture is the most important economic activity with more than 1,000 km^{2} of planted area. The main crops are grapes, cotton, and wheat. Despite the arid climate, wells are used for irrigated crops. The cattle herd is modest, concentrating on exporting calves to the United States. In 2020, agricultural exports to the United States were 260 million dollars.

=== Cattle raising ===
The livestock that takes place in the municipality is mixed, extensive and intensive. Cattle are mainly produced, and sheep and goats are produced to a lesser extent.

With regard to cattle, dairy cattle and beef cattle are exploited, the first to meet internal demands and those of some neighboring municipalities. In beef cattle, the main production is calves that are exported to the United States. It is popularly known that the beef produced by Caborca is the Best in Mexico according to the opinion of consumers from other states of the country.

=== Commerce ===
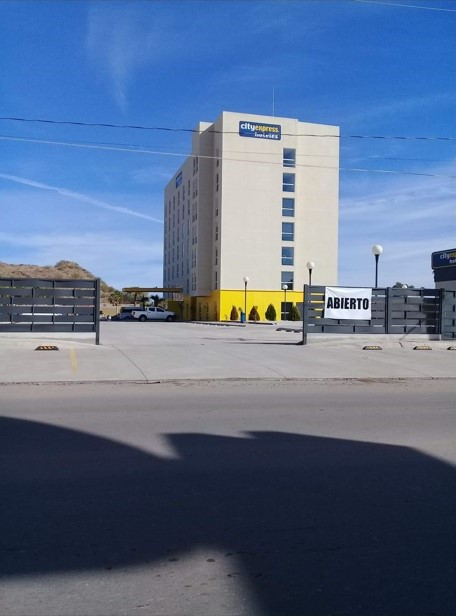
Brand of a famous international chain of Business Hotels located on Quiroz y Mora avenue in one of the most important commercial areas of the city of Caborca.

This sector is characterized by being functional towards the activities of the primary sector. Its commercial structure is made up of 815 wholesale and retail establishments in the grocery business, pharmacies, clothing and footwear stores, wine and liquor stores, furniture stores, and hardware stores. Commerce generates 7,977 jobs, being the most important activity for the economy of the municipality, since it employs 43% of the employed population. The city also has two shopping centers with cinemas: Cinépolis and Cinemex, and there are also many national and international commercial chains located throughout the city as well as many franchises.

=== Mining ===
The mining that is being developed has great potential on a small and medium scale, since it has regions with a high concentration of gold and silver, such as San Felipe, San Francisco, El Plomito and San Carlos.

The La Herradura mine is one of the main gold mines in the municipality of Caborca, it began operations in 1997, with an area of 800,000 hectares and a depth of 80 meters at sea level, during 2007 the mine produced 6.1 tons of gold, thereby occupying the second place, with 39 tons extracted throughout the country during the same period. There are also the Noche Buena Mine, the Centauro Deep Mine and the Santa Elena Mine, contributing in large part to Caborca's GDP and generating thousands of jobs. Mining generated several hundred million dollars in 2020.

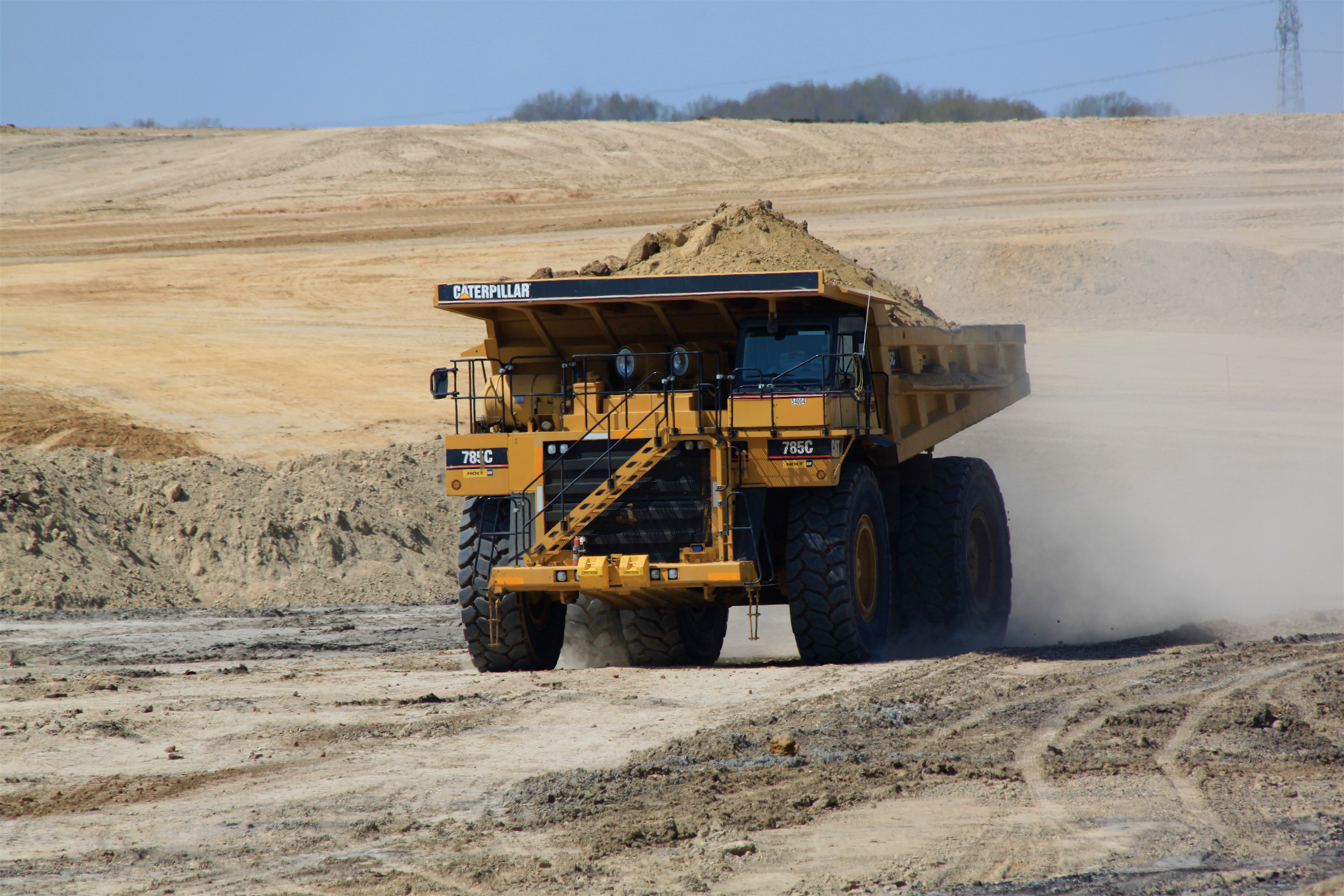
Mining in Caborca

== Cultural and tourist attractions ==
=== Historic and cultural sites ===
Monuments of the Inmaculada Concepcion de Nuestra Señora de Caborca were built during the Franciscan period from 1803 to 1809, and dedicated on 8 May.

There are also works of art such as cave paintings, hieroglyphics, and rock engravings located in the Bízani region, on the Caborca coast.

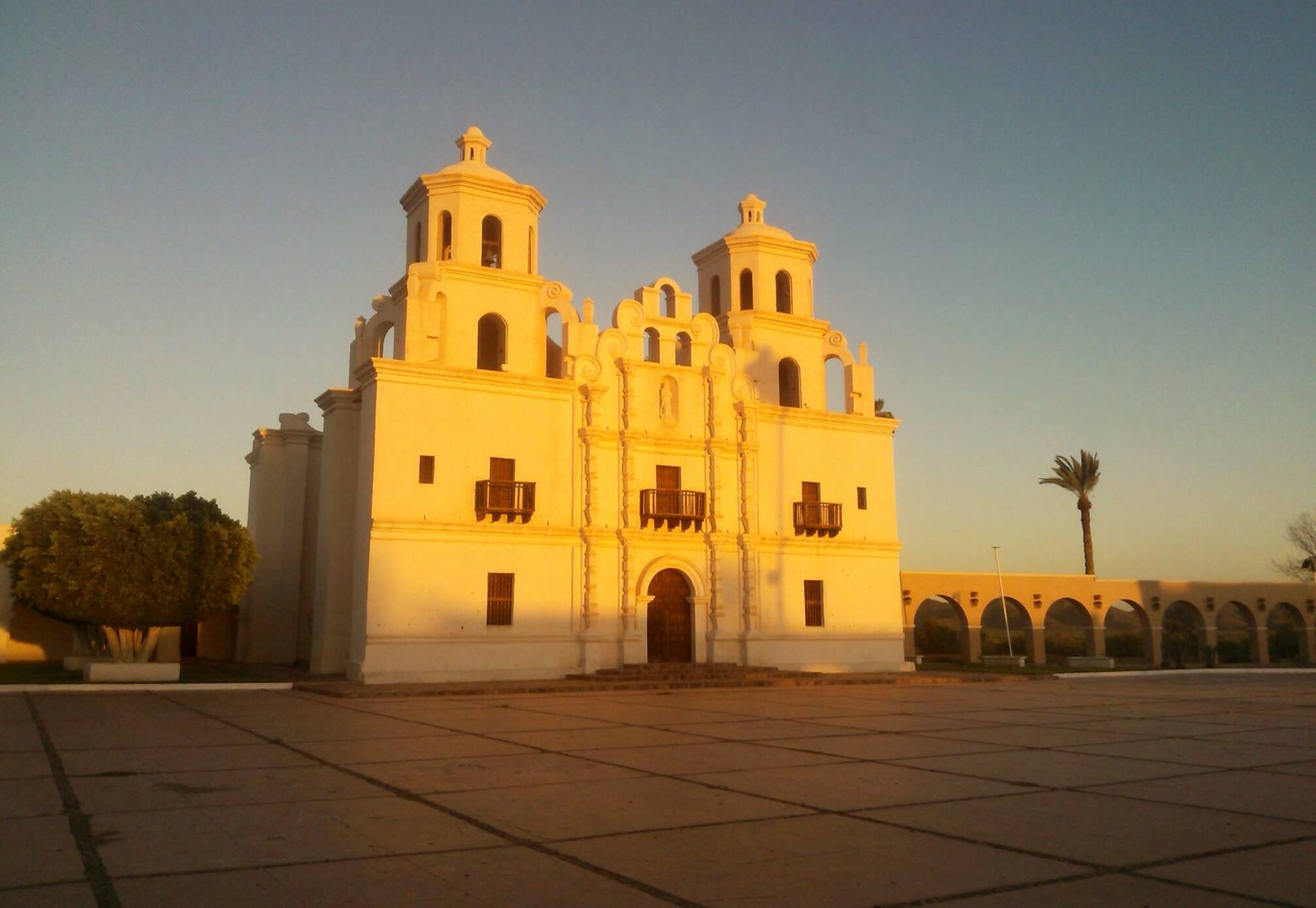
Temple of the Immaculate Conception of Our Lady of Caborca.

=== Festivals, dances, and traditions ===
Caborquenses commemorate Mexico's national holidays in the month of September, very much in the Sonoran style.

On 20 November, the Mexican Revolution is celebrated, with a civic-sports parade.

There are records of an annual celebration held in the month of January; among the activities of these celebrations, there were races between Papagos and mestizos, as well as Seris, Tohono O'odhams and Opatas, who were known for their great speed, to the point of beating horses over short distances.

=== Tourist centers ===
The tourist attractions are:

- Temple of the Immaculate Conception also known as the Historic Temple
- Historical and Ethnographic Museum of Caborca
- Archaeological Zone of Cave Art La Proveedora
- Cerro San José Cave Art Archaeological Zone
- The beaches of Puerto Lobos, Desemboque and Santo Tomás
- The Wine and Asparagus Route.
- Sporting, artistic and cultural events.
- Crafts and regional products
- Health tourism since it has various medical care clinics
- Gastronomic tourism with its large number of restaurants with regional, national and international cuisine
- 4x4 touring events
- Ethnotourism with the Tohono O'otham
- Mountain biking events.
- The traditional Puerto Lobos fishing tournament.
- Its beaches, Historic Temple, desert landscapes, cattle ranches, flora and fauna, vineyards and olive trees, archaeological sites for filming and documentaries are currently being promoted.
- La Arboleda Recreational Park
- The Lienzo charro La Arboleda
- The Autodromo Juan Chait (quarter mile for cars)
- The hill of the virgin and the cavalcade of 12 December
- Horse racing

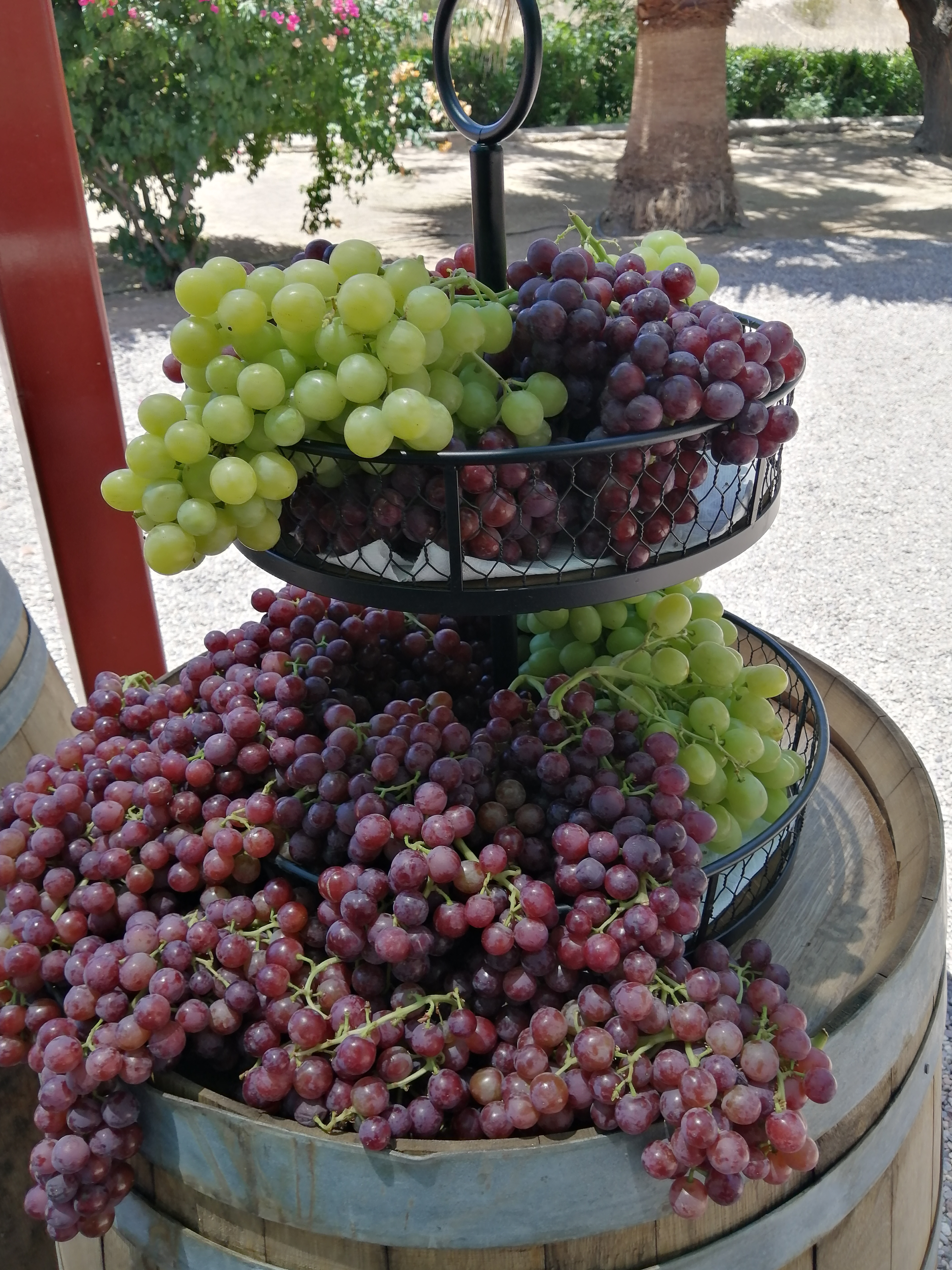
Agrotourism route

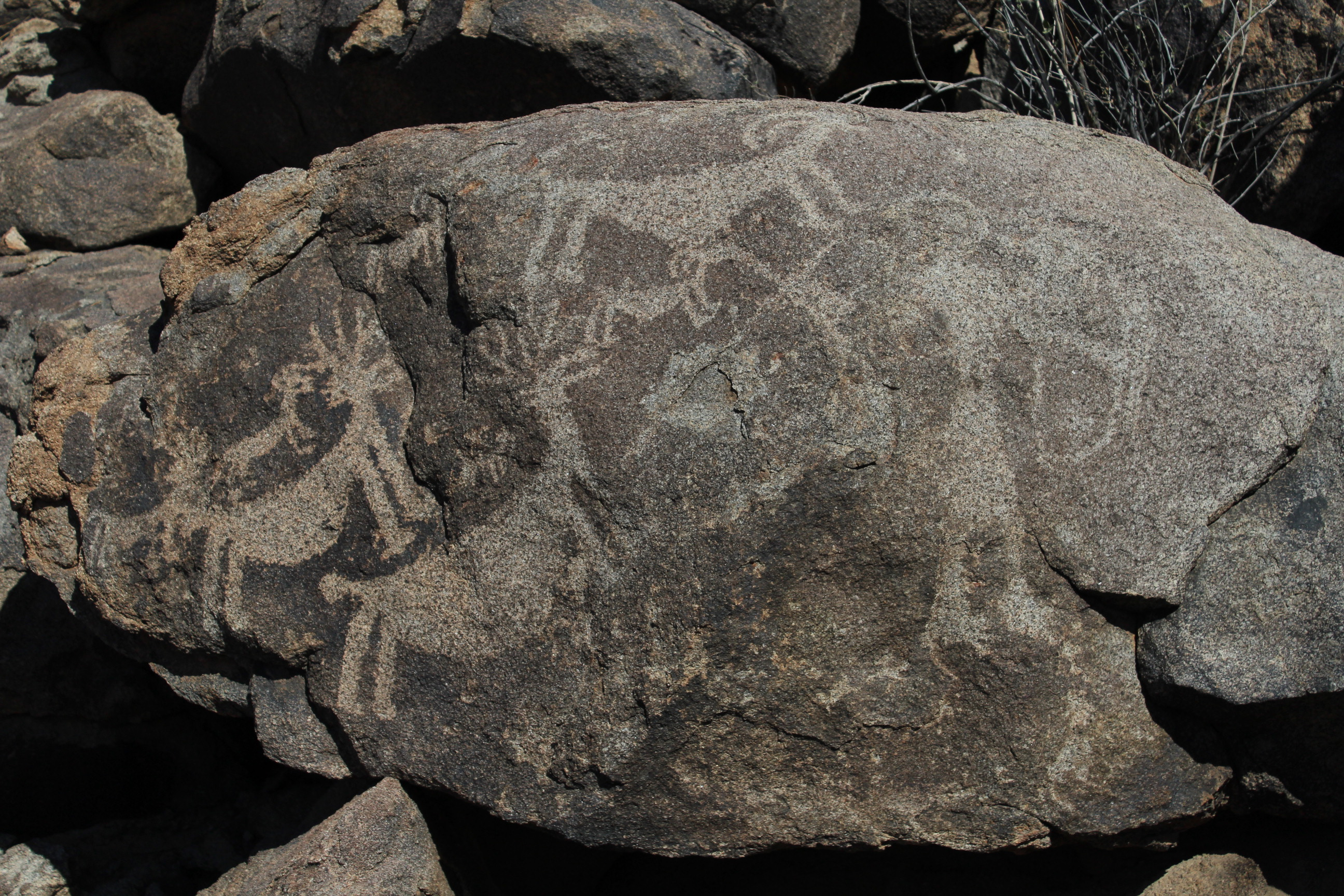
La Proveedora Archaeological Zone

== Communication channels ==
The city of Caborca is connected to the rest of the state through the Mexico-Tijuana highway; to the north with the municipalities of San Luis Río Colorado and Puerto Peñasco, and to the south with Pitiquito, Altar, and Santa Ana. It has the four-lane highway Santa Ana-Caborca; It also has a cargo railway station in the city of Caborca, an intercity bus station, urban transport, taxi services, and an airstrip for light aircraft traffic.

== Sister cities ==
- Prescott, Arizona, United States
- Upland, California, United States
- San Rafael, Veracruz, Mexico

== Sports ==
The city has a sports infrastructure that includes the Heroes of Caborca Baseball Stadium, the Fidencio Hernández Soccer Stadium, the Municipal Basketball Gym, the Multifunctional Gym, the "Dr. Enrique García" athletics track, as well as multiple units of sports.

== Notable people ==
- Abigael Bohórquez (1936-1995): poet, writer and playwright.
- Miguel Caro Quintero (1963-): Mexican drug lord, younger brother of Rafael Caro Quintero and founder and leader of Sonora Cartel.
- Marbella Corella (1988-): singer of the ranchero genre and ballads.
- Luis Loroña (1993-): Professional soccer player for Tampico Madero F.C..
- Vladimir Loroña (1998-): professional soccer player for Xolos de Tijuana.
- Christian Nodal (1999-): singer and composer of the Mexican regional genre.
- Luis R. Conriquez (1991-) singer and composer of the Mexican regional genre.

== Town planning ==
The urban layout of the city of Caborca was carried out by Domingo Quiroz y Mora in 1872. Currently one of the main avenues of the city bears his name. Caborca has a reticular or grid urban layout for the most part, which facilitates its ordering and transportation of its inhabitants. Most city blocks are 100 m x 100 m. The city covers an area of more than 25 square km and is constantly growing due to the great economic dynamism of Caborca.

== Regional influence and impact ==
According to INEGI, the population of the city of Caborca is 67,604 inhabitants, the population of the municipality of Caborca is 89,122 inhabitants, the population of the municipality of Caborca including nearby municipalities such as Pitiquito and Altar is 107,736 inhabitants, the population of the entire region and area of influence of Caborca is 111,712 inhabitants including the population of the municipalities of Caborca, Pitiquito, Altar, Oquitoa, Atil, Tubutama, Saric and Trincheras. The economic life of these municipalities is linked to Caborca. The city of Caborca is the seat of most educational centers, businesses, industries, offices and regional services.

== Bibliography ==
- United States Department of State (1857–1861). Execution of Colonel Crabb and associates: Message from the President of the United States communicating official information and correspondence in relation to the execution of Colonel Crabb and his associates. James B. Steedman.
