= Yaqui Wars =

Conflicts involving Yaqui Indians in New Spain and Mexican Republic

- Part of the Mexican Indian Wars and the American Indian Wars
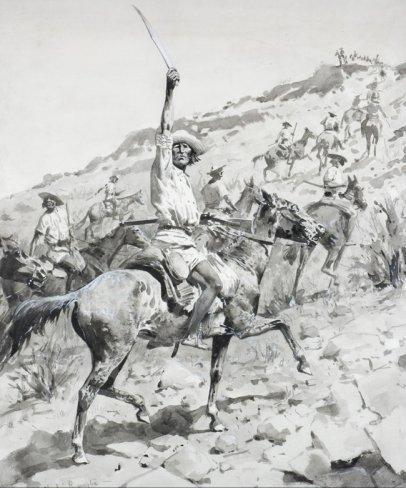
- Uprising of the Yaqui Indians – Yaqui Warriors in Retreat, by Frederic Remington, 1896.
Date	1533–1929
Location	Sonora, Mexico; Arizona, United States; Texas, United States
Result	Mexican/United States victory

Belligerents
Crown of Castile (1533–1716); Spain (1716–1821); Mexico (1821–1929); United States (1896–1929)	Yaqui; Yaqui Allies: Mayo; Opata; Pima

Commanders and leaders
(Mexico) Lorenzo Torres; (Mexico) Alvaro Obregon; (Mexico) Rafael Izábal (WIA); (Mexico) Emilio Kosterlitsky; (United States) Frank Wheaton; (United States) Frederick H.L. Ryder	Juan Banderas (executed); Cajemé (executed); Tetabiate †; Teresa Urrea

The Yaqui Wars were a series of armed conflicts between New Spain, and its successor state, the Mexican Republic, against the Yaqui Native American people. The period began in 1533 and lasted until 1929. The Yaqui Wars, along with the Caste War against the Maya, were the last conflicts of the centuries long Mexican Indian Wars. Over the course of nearly 400 years, the Spanish and the Mexicans repeatedly launched military campaigns into Yaqui territory which resulted in several serious battles and massacres.

== Wars ==
=== 18th century ===
The cause of the conflicts was like many of the Indian Wars. In 1684, the Spanish colonists in the present day Mexican state of Sonora discovered silver in the Rio Yaqui Valley. Following this, the Spanish gradually began settling on Yaqui land, and by 1740, the natives were ready to resist. Some minor conflicts from before dated back to 1533 but in 1740 the Yaqui united with the neighboring Mayo, Opata, and Pima tribes and successfully drove the colonists out by 1742.

=== Juan Banderas ===
During the Mexican War of Independence from Spain (1810–1821) the Yaqui did not participate on either side. It was when Occidente passed a law in 1825 making the Yaqui its citizens and subjecting them to taxes that the Yaqui decided to go to war, since they had not previously been subjected to taxes. The first fighting was at Rahum. The movement was encouraged by Pedro Leyva, a Catholic priest and took the Virgin of Guadalupe as its symbol. The Yaqui coalesced around Juan Banderas as their leader. Juan Banderas was a noted Yaqui leader, who after receiving visions in 1825, attempted to unite the Yaqui and other nearby tribal groups, including the Opata, Lower Pima (Pima Bajo), and Mayo, under the banner of the Virgin of Guadalupe. Banderas successfully challenged Mexican rule in Sonora and Sinaloa between 1825 and 1832. Occidente was so affected by the war that the capital was moved from Cosala to Fuerte. In 1827 Banderas' forces were defeated by Mexicans in the vicinity of Hermosillo. This defeat was partly due to the Yaquis having primarily bows and arrows, while the Mexicans had guns. After this defeat, Banderas negotiated a peace with Occidente, in which he was granted pardon, and recognized as a captain-general of the Yaqui, and was given a salary.

In 1828 the office of captain-general was abolished, and Occidente government reasserted its right to tax the Yaqui, as well as proposing a plan for allotting the Yaqui lands. In 1832 Banderas renewed the war against the Mexican authorities, in cooperation with Dolores Gutiérrez, a chief of the Opata people. Mexican forces captured Banderas and other Indian leaders after the defeat of Banderas' forces at the battle of Soyopa, Sonora, in December, 1832. In 1833 Banderas and Gutiérrez, along with 10 others, were executed in January 1833. Banderas remained a powerful and admired symbol of Yaqui resistance to foreign domination.

=== Mid-19th century resistance ===
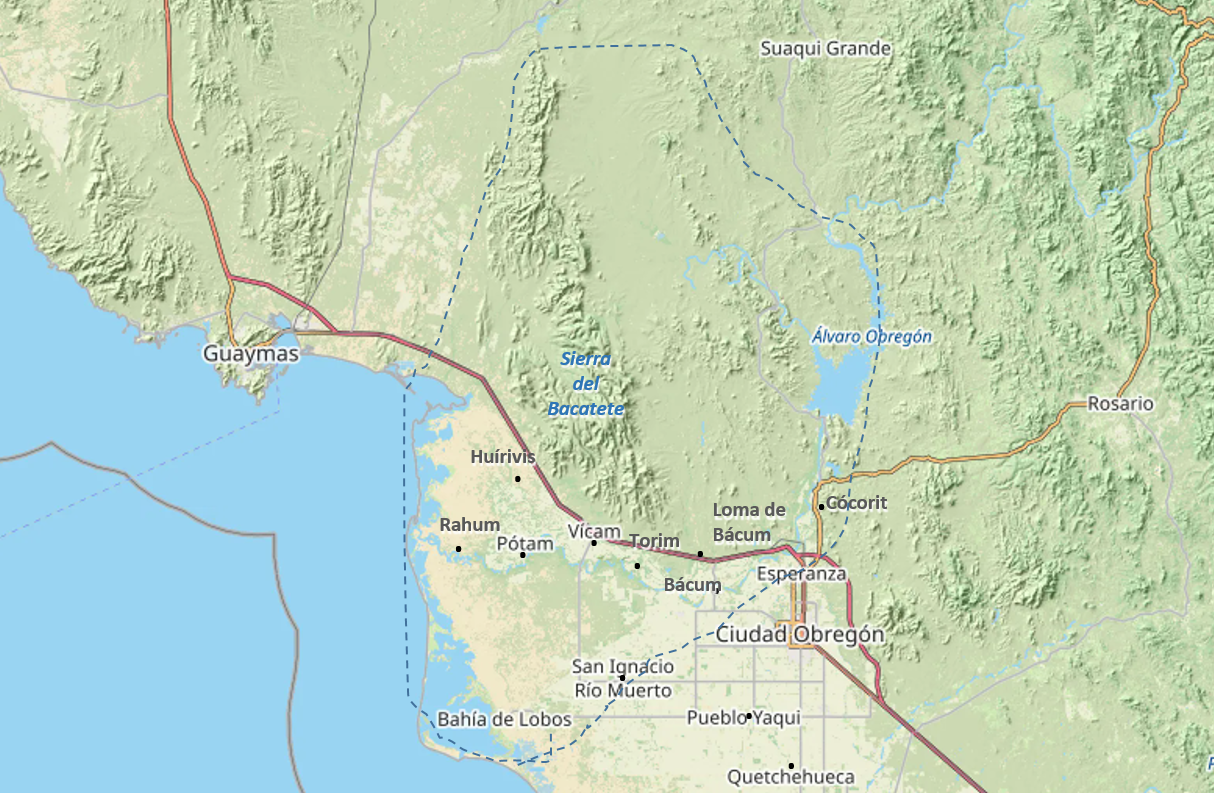
Yaqui Nation

Some warriors fled from their occupied pueblos along the Rio Yaqui and continued fighting in the Sierra Vakatetteve. In 1834 Yaquis at Torim tried to drive the Mexican settlers from that location. The Mexican forces in this fighting were led by a Yaqui, Juan Ignacio Juscamea. Juscamea continued to cooperate with the Mexican government until 1840 when he was killed by anti-Mexican Yaquis in fighting at Horcasitas.

During the 1830s and 1840s the Yaqui often allied with Manuel María Gándara, a former conservative governor of Sonora, in his struggle against José de Urrea for control of Sonora. In 1838 this led to Urrea capturing the coastal salt deposits of the Yaqui and transferring them to state control.

In 1857 Gándara was removed from power by Ignacio Pesqueira. The Yaqui under the leadership of Mateo Marquin, also known as Jose Maria Barquin, were among the chief allies of Gándara in his attempt to regain control of Sonora. Initially most of the fighting was in the Guaymas River valley. However, in 1858 Cócorit became a point of violence. The Mayos joined the Yaqui in waging war against the Mexican government, and destroyed Santa Cruz, Sonora.

In August 1860, bands of Yaqui and Mayo insurgents, some 1,000 or 1,200 strong, marched towards Guaymas, burning and leveling Mexican settlements as they advanced. The citizens of Guaymas fortified the town, declaring a state of siege, and armed 350 men in its defense. The Prefect of Guaymas dispatched a courier to the Governor at Hermosillo, demanding additional aid.

The dispatch reached Hermosillo on the 31st of August. Governor Pesquiera, with a force of sixty horse and eighty infantry, promptly left Hermosillo. He intended to travel to El Cachora to gather an additional 300 troops, but the Yaqui ambushed him and his troops en route at Jacalitos, a small village about forty-two miles from Hermosillo.

The inexperienced Mexican troops fled the battle, leaving Pesquiera and General Angel Trias of Chihuahua, who accompanied Pesquiera, with some eight or ten of the body guard to face 600 well armed Yaqui. Pesquiera and Angel Trias eventually succeeded in escaping and joined the forces at El Cachora. Following this defeat, Pesqueira invaded Mayo and Yaqui territory in 1862, and forced them to accept peace terms. The peace was negotiated at Torim, Sonora. The terms of the peace allowed a pardon to the leaders of the Yaqui, but required a military post to be established at Agua Caliente, Sonora, for the Mexicans to control the actions of the Yaqui.

=== Second French Intervention ===
After the French victory over Pesqueira at Guaymas in 1865, the Yaqui allied with the French in fighting the Mexicans. Mateo Marquin publicly expressed support for the French. Refugio Tánori, a leader of the Opata, also allied with the French. These native allies of the French took control of Alamos, Sonora, and drove Pesquira from his base at Ures. In 1868, with the withdrawal of the French, Pesqueira appointed pro-Mexican Yaqui to administer the Yaqui towns, but in Bácum the Yaqui killed this official.

Pesqueira then appointed Garcia Morales to lead a campaign against the Yaqui. In 1868, 600 Yaqui surrendered at Cócorit. The Mexicans held 400 Yaqui in a church, and when they felt the Yaqui were not being cooperative enough, fired artillery on the church causing a fire that killed 120 men, women and children, an incident that came to be known as the Bacum massacre. This was representative of the harsh military attacks on the Yaqui, who accepted peace terms to avoid continued massacres. Affairs such as this drove many of the natives to emigrate, while others were deported by the Mexicans or enslaved.

=== Cajemé ===
In 1874 Pesqueira appointed Cajemé as alcalde-mayor of all the towns of both the Yaqui and Mayo. José J. Pesqueira, son of the current governor, was designated successor to the governor. This caused an attempt to violently appoint a new governor, which Pesqueira reacted to by attacking Cajemé and his people. From Medano, Pesqueira attacked a large number of Yaqui residents, killing Yaqui just because they were present, and pillaging their farms and ranches.

In 1876 the Yaqui leader José Maria Leyba Peres, or Cajemé, established a small independent republic in Sonora. By then there were only about 4,000 undefeated Yaqui, and they attempted to defend their county by building the fortification called El Añil (The Indigo). El Añil was located near the village of Vícam, in the middle of a thick forest and on the left bank of the Yaqui river. The fortification consisted of a wide moat. Food and livestock were stockpiled within the fortification, and to assure a source of water, there was a large trench to the river. There was also a wooden stockade with walls made of thick trunks of trees placed side by side, and woven with branches providing an enclosure where the 4000 Yaqui people were protected.

Agustin Ortiz, whose brother Carlos was then the governor of Sonora, led an attack from Navojoa to Capetemaya in 1882, with the intention of capturing Cajemé. Cajemé was wounded in the Battle of Capetemaya, but the forces of Ortiz were routed. Fighting in the Mayo territories continued until 1884 when they agreed to submit to Mexican authority. However, Cajemé continued to insist on his independence.

In 1885 Loreto Molino, a Yaqui who had previously been one of Cajemé's chief lieutenants or teniente-general, led a raid from Guaymas against Cajemé's home. The house was burned down, but Cajemé was in the south at the time and thus survived the attack. The repercussions of this raid, which was sanctioned by the local Mexican government, led to a resumption of full-scale war between the Yaqui and the Mexican government. In March 1886, three columns, each about 1,200 strong, were set in motion against the Yaquis. Every Mexican town or point of importance was fortified and garrisoned to resist any hostile Yaqui forces. The mitrailleuse is reported to have been used by the Mexican Federal Forces against the well organized Yaqui forces. Three of them were used, with two mitrailleuse under the command of the forces of Generals Leiva and Marcos Carillo, and one under the command of General Camano

In May, 1886, the Mexican army began a concentrated series of military campaigns against the main Yaqui fortress of El Añil. General Carrillo, with 1,200 soldiers, initially attacked El Añil in a fierce battle to dislodge the indigenous Yaqui forces. General Ángel Martínez brought up an additional 1,500 Mexican soldiers, and concentrated his forces to finish the campaign with a decisive blow. El Añil was captured on May 12, 1886. Only a few Yaqui soldiers escaped by fleeing deep into the mountains, leaving 200 dead, and some 2,000 people, consisting primarily of the elderly, children, and the sick. The losses of the Mexican forces were 10 officers and 59 troops. Following the battle, the people living in the villages of Huiribis, Pótam, Bacum, Cócorit were amnestied by the Mexican government, in return for giving up their weapons. In return, the people in the villages were given clothes and food. The bulk of the remaining Yaqui soldiers were now unable to make war directly on Mexican military forces, so hid in the mountains, while being persecuted and systematically decimated. At this point, Cajemé sent a note to General Juan Hernández saying"

"Desde luego nos someteremos todos a la obediencia del gobierno, bajo la condición de que dentro de 15 días se retiren todas sus fuerzas que están en el río Yaqui para Guaymas y Hermosillo, de no hacerlo así, pueden ustedes obrar de manera que les convenga; yo, en unión de mi nación, estoy dispuesto a hacer hasta la última defensa."

"We will all submit in obedience to government, under the condition that within 15 days [the government will] withdraw all their forces at the Rio Yaqui to Guaymas and Hermosillo. Failing to do so, you can act in a way that suits them [the government]. I, together with my nation, am willing to continue [fighting] until the last defense."

Nearly one year later, Cajemé was captured in the village of San José de Guaymas, about 10 miles outside of the Port of Guaymas. Cajemé was eventually transported to the mouth of the Yaqui River, and paraded through many of the Yaqui villages to show that he had been captured. On April 23, 1887, Cajemé was executed at Tres Cruces de Chumampaco. Juan Maldonado took Cajemé's place, and continued a guerrilla war in the Sierra del Bacatete. The Yaqui towns along the Rio Yaqui became mostly deserted, with many of the inhabitants fleeing into the surrounding mountains, and to other states in Mexico, including Chihuahua and Sinaloa.

=== Yaqui Uprising, 1896 ===
In February 1896 an event known as the Yaqui Uprising began after the Mexican revolutionary Lauro Aguirre drafted a plan to overthrow the government of Porfirio Díaz. Aguirre and his men were able to convince several Yaqui and Pima natives to join in the revolt so on August 12 a combined force of no less than seventy men attacked the customs house at Nogales, Sonora. A battle then ensued which left at least three people dead and many more wounded. During the fight a group of American militia formed in the adjoining town of Nogales, Arizona and they assisted the Mexican defenders in repelling the rebels' attack. Ultimately the Yaquis and the others were obliged to withdraw from the area, ending the uprising and leading to a United States Army operation to track the hostiles. Two companies of the 24th Infantry Regiment were assigned to hunt the rebels who were being pursued by troops of the Mexican Army Colonel Emilio Kosterlitsky. However, the rebels got away, some escaped to Arizona. In 1897 a peace treaty was signed in Ortiz between the Yaquis and the Mexican government. Nevertheless, in 1899 another serious outbreak of hostilities began and it led to the bloody Mazocoba Massacre of 1900, in which several hundred natives were killed. Manuel Balbás wrote in Recuerdos del Yaqui how some Yaquis at Mazocoba survived combat, but chose to take their own life, either with their own weapons or by jumping from cliffs, rather than surrender to the enemy. One event in which a young woman who had been hiding but was discovered, without a tear in her eyes, "approached the body of her loved one, knelt a moment, bowed slightly, and perhaps for a last time looked at the face of the beloved, and arose at once, quickly running like a gazelle toward the precipice, and without a moment's hesitation, plunged into the abyss." It was at this point in time, in the late 1890s and early years of the 1900s, that a large number of Yaqui people began traveling north to settle in the United States around Tucson and Phoenix, Arizona, and into parts of Texas, including the El Paso area, as well as the Lubbock area, where a group of Yaqui refugees had settled years earlier.

=== Later developments ===
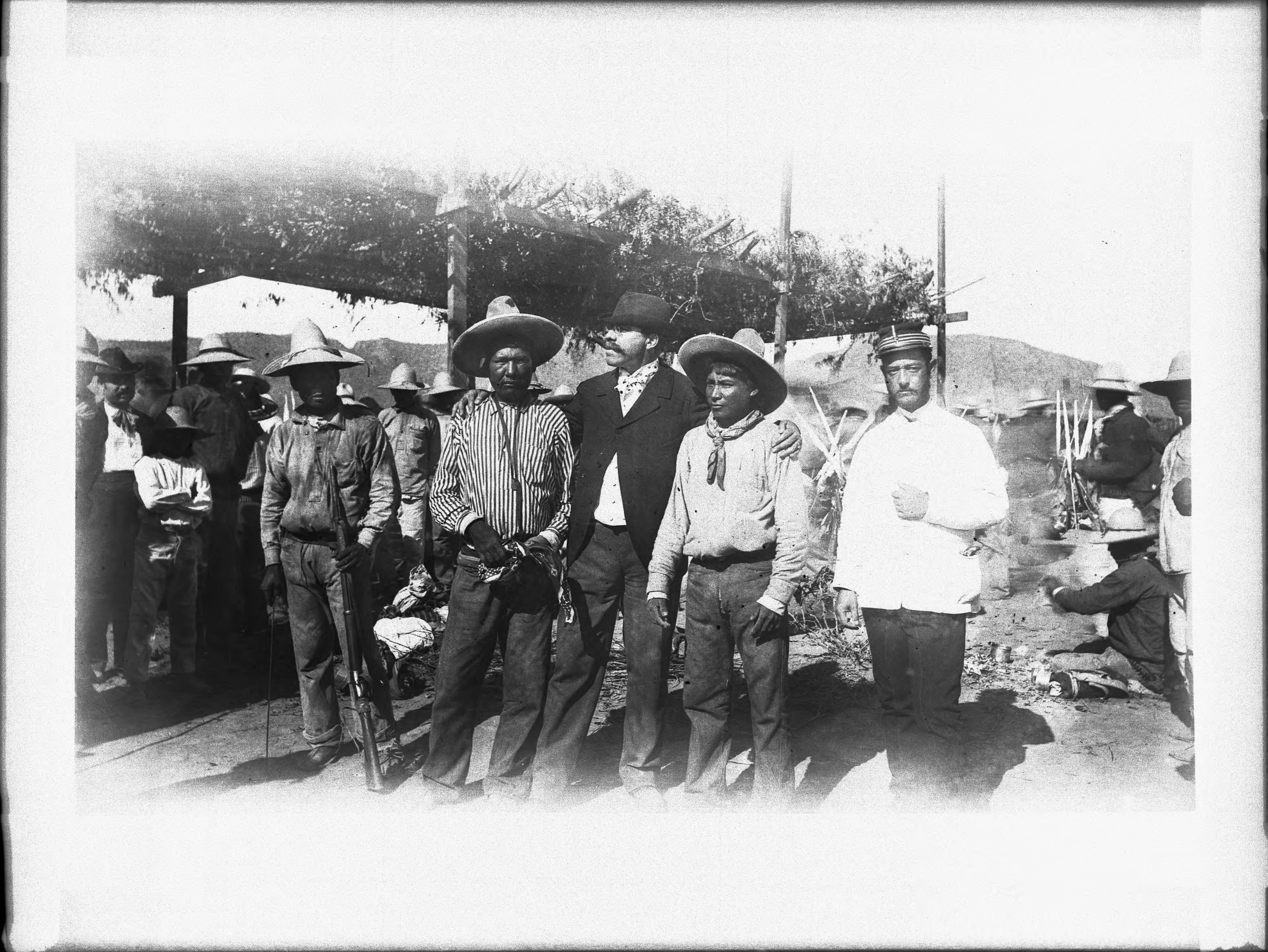
a group of Yaqui Indians at the surrender and signing of peace treaty at Ortiz, Mexico, ca.1910. Two Mexicans stand near three Indians in the foreground.

Around this time Porfirio Díaz began advocating for a solution to the Yaqui wars. By 1903 the decision was made to deport both the peaceful and rebellious Yaqui natives to the Yucatan and Oaxaca. Meanwhile, from 1904 to 1909, the Mexican governor of Sonora, Rafael Izábal, led "organized manhunts" in which about 8,000 to 15,000 Yaquis were taken prisoner and "virtually enslaved".

15,000 to 60,000 Yaquis perished in deportations in 1900 through 1911. Following the outbreak of the Mexican Revolution in 1910, Yaqui warriors joined all of the armies of the major rebel factions. They also began resettling their ancestral lands along the Rio Yaqui. In 1911, Díaz was exiled and President Francisco Madero took office. He is said to have promised the Yaqui people compensation for their losses but by 1920, when the main phase of the war ended, the promises were forgotten. By 1916, Mexican generals, such as Álvaro Obregón, began establishing estates on Yaqui land during the revolution and this led to renewed hostilities between the natives and the military.

It was during this period of the conflict that the United States Army fought the last battle of the American Indian Wars. In January 1918, a small group of about thirty natives were intercepted by Buffalo Soldiers of the 10th Cavalry, just across the international border, near Arivaca, Arizona. In the thirty-minute skirmish that followed, the Yaqui commander was killed and a handful of others were taken prisoner. The last major engagement of the Yaqui Wars came almost ten years later in what is called "The Yaqui Revolt of 1926–1928." The battle began in April 1927 at Cerro del Gallo (Hill of the Rooster. Yaqui name: Totoi-ta-kuse'epo). On April 28, 1927, the Los Angeles Times reported that Mexican Federal Troops had captured 415 Yaquis, including 26 men, 214 women, and 175 children. It was reported in the Mexican newspaper El Universal that because the Yaqui had withdrawn in the mountains, the Mexican Federal Staff had decided to undertake a major offensive against them. Operations would be directed by General Obregón, assisted by General Manzo. According to another report published on October 5, 1927, 12,000 "federales" were soon to present in the state of Sonora, equipped with 8mm machine guns, airplanes and poison gas. On October 2, 1927, the Los Angeles Times reported that General Francisco R. Manzo, Commander of the federal forces in Sonora, had informed President Calles that he expected the Yaqui chieftain, Luis Matius, would soon surrender after holding out in the Bacatete Mountains for more than a year. After that, some minor warfare continued into 1929 but the violence was quelled mainly by bombings from the Mexican Air Force. The Mexican Army also established posts at all of the Yaqui settlements. This action prevented future conflict.

== Gallery ==
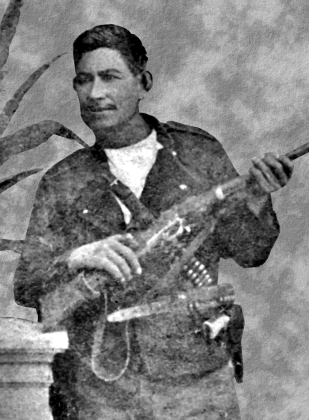
The Yaqui warrior Cajemé in April 1887, taken at the time of his arrest by Mexican authorities.

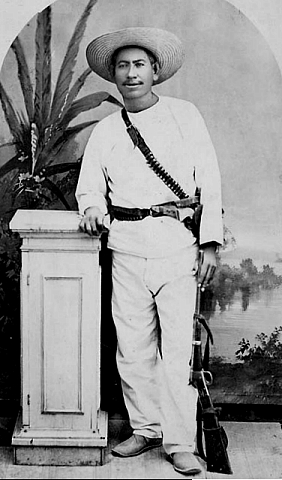
Cajemé under arrest at Guaymas in April 1887.

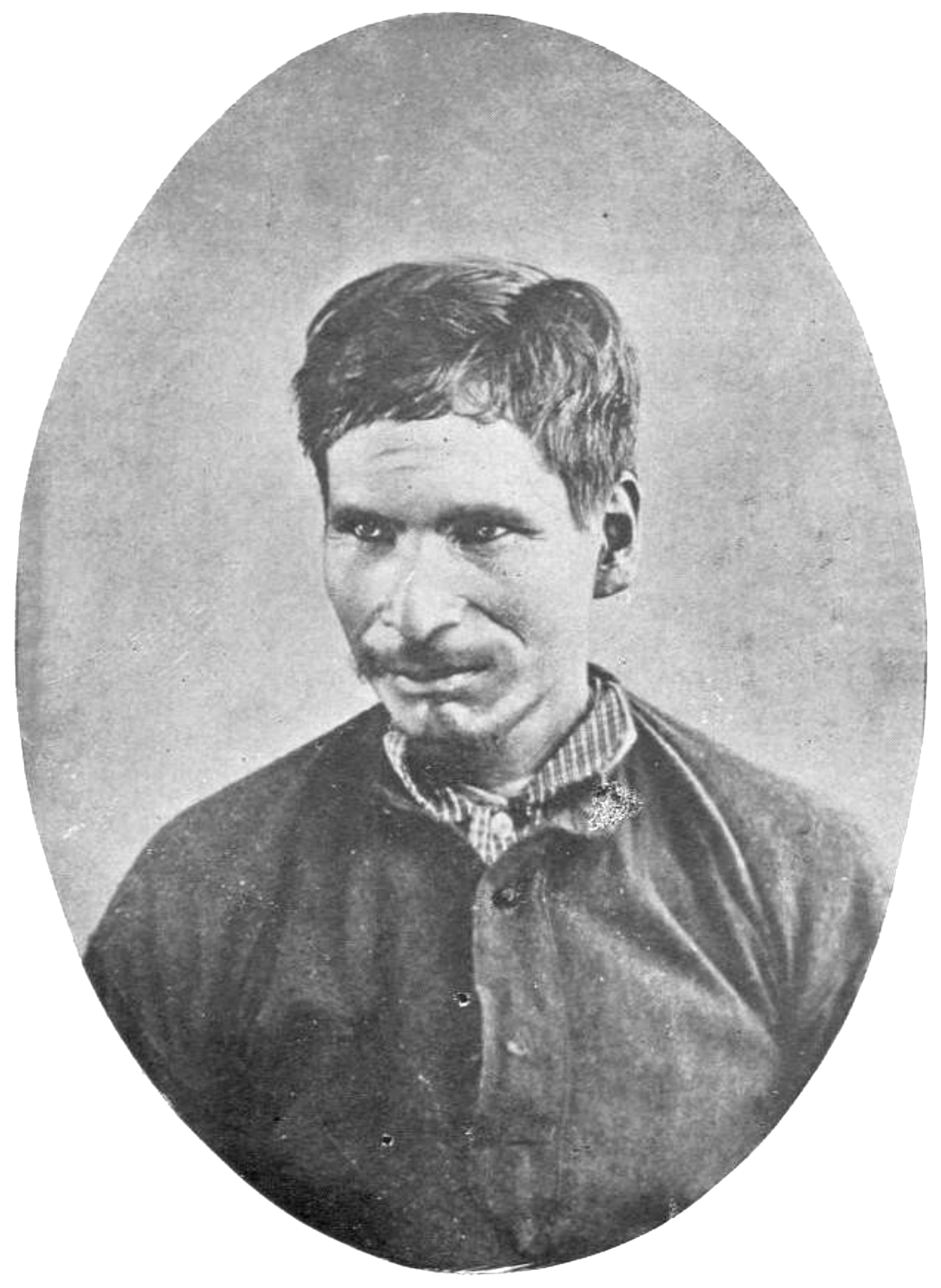
The Yaqui leader Anastacio Cuca in May 1887.

Tres Cruces de Chumampaco in 1895, where Cajemé was killed.

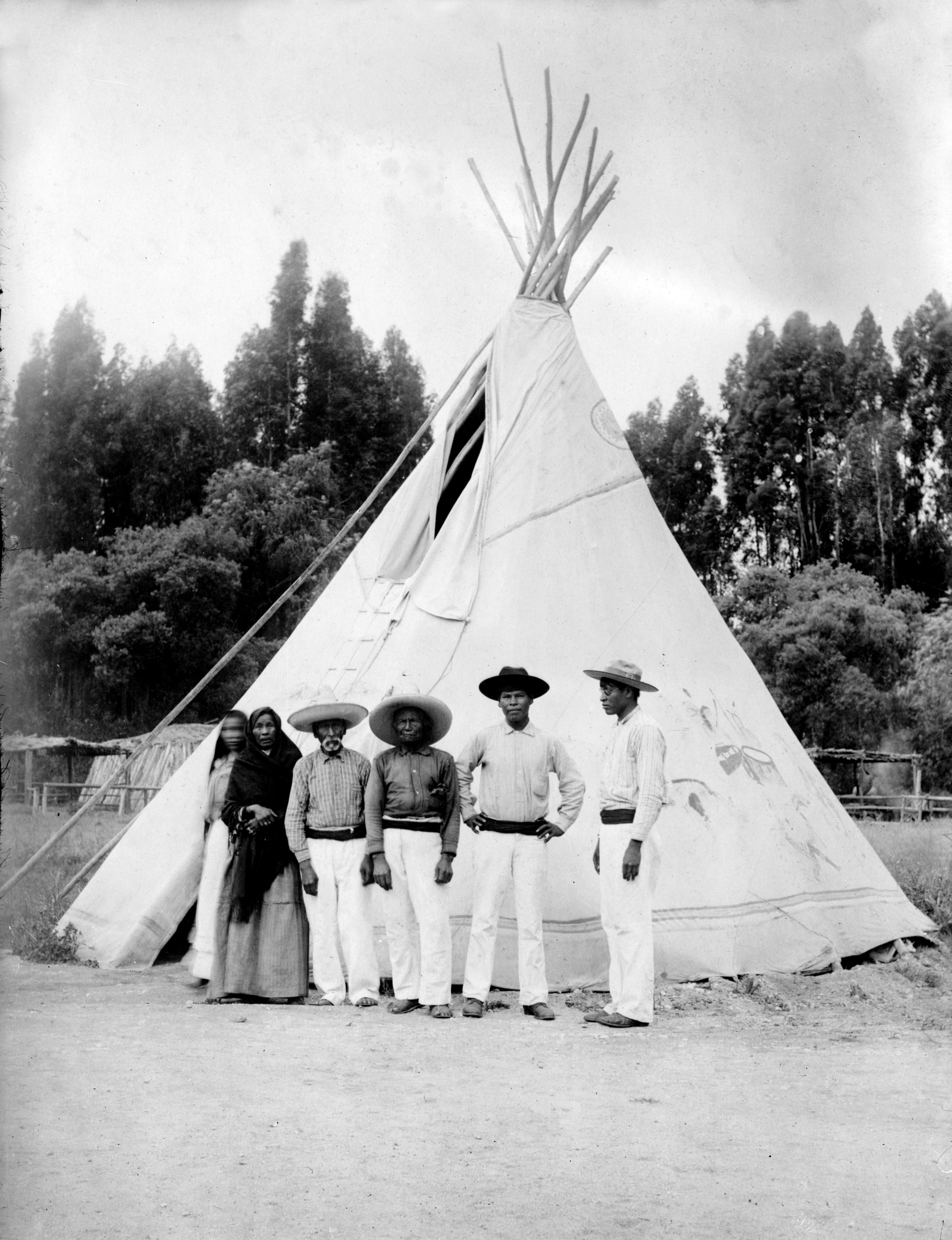
Yaqui people, c. 1910.

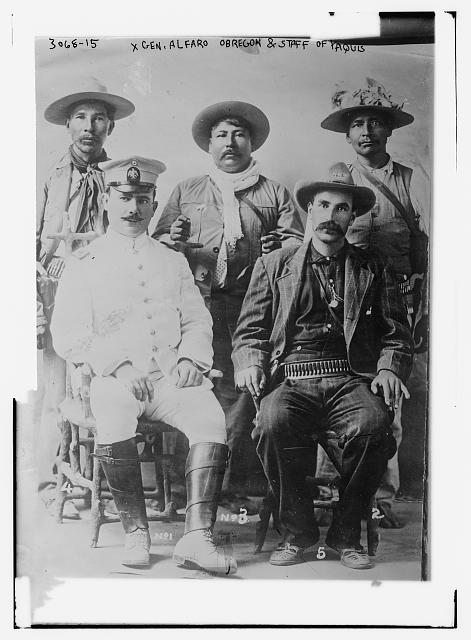
General Álvaro Obregón and his staff of Yaquis, sometime between 1910 and 1915.

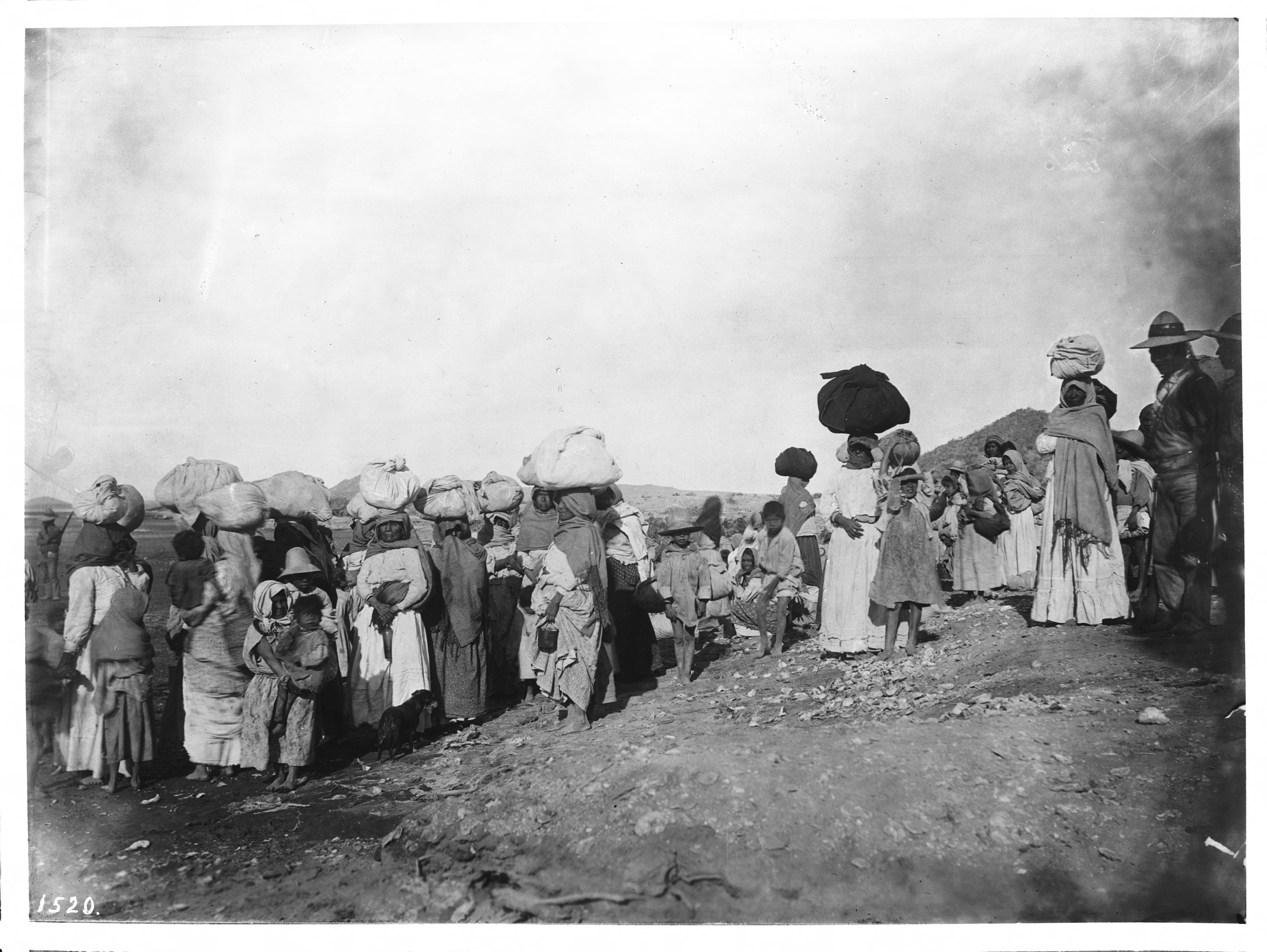
A group of more than 30 Yaqui Indian prisoners being escorted away by Mexican soldiers, Mexico, c. 1910

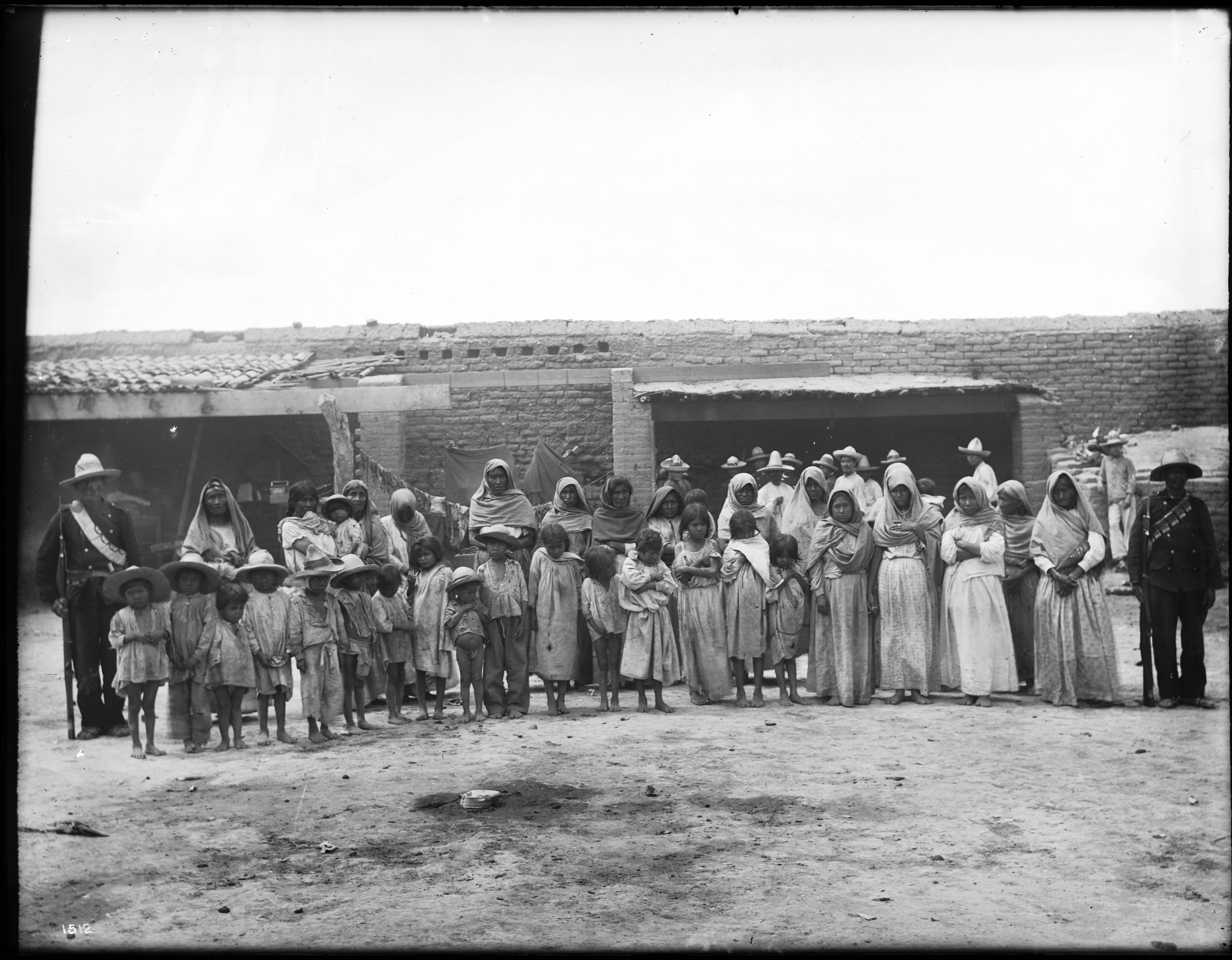
A group of more than 30 women and children Yaqui Indian prisoners under guard, Guaymas, Mexico, c. 1910

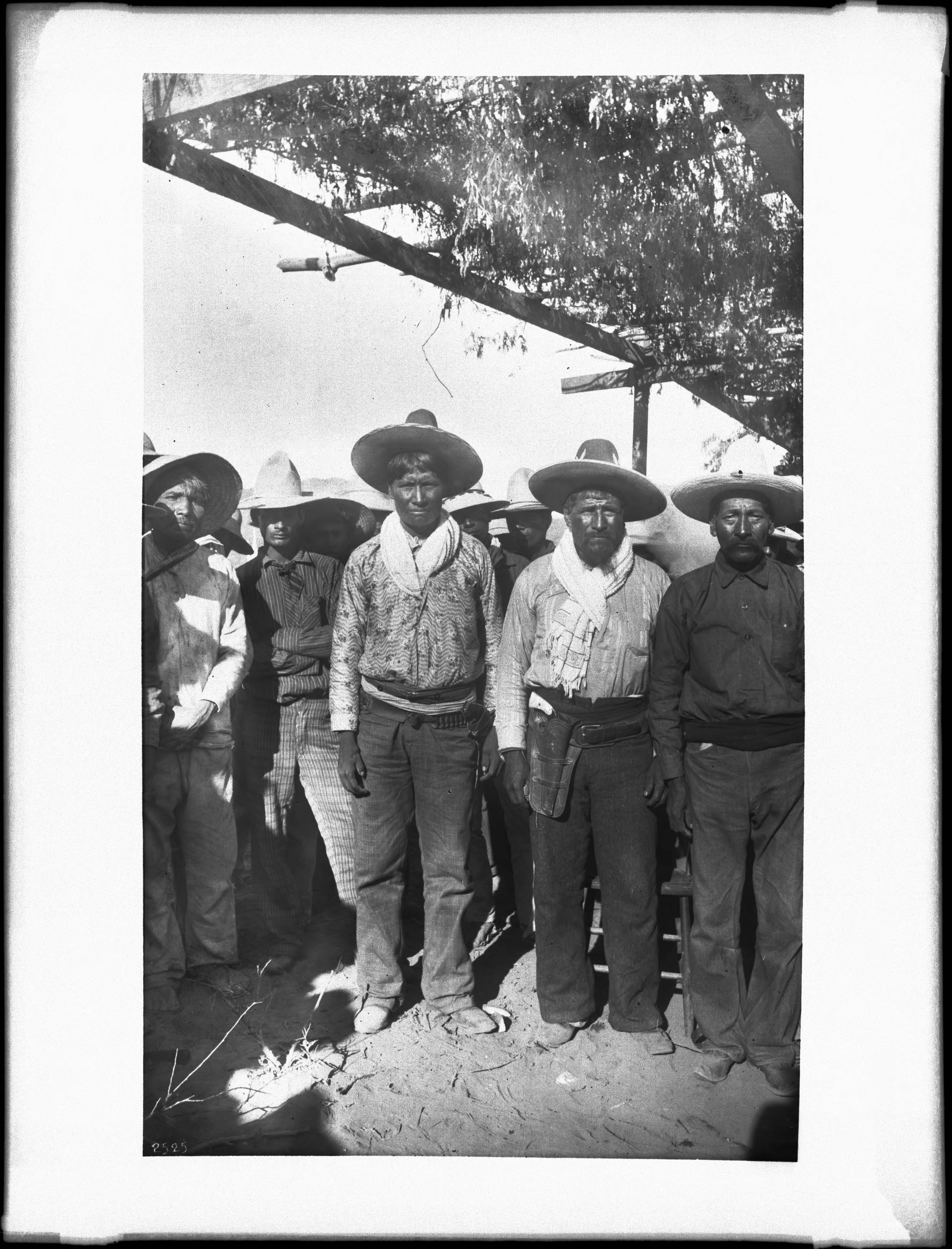
A group of Yaqui Indians, including Chief Talaviate, at the surrender and signing of peace treaty at Ortiz, Mexico, c. 1910

== See also ==
- Pascua Yaqui Tribe
- Texas Band of Yaqui Indians
- Renegade period
- Mexican Apache Wars
- Mexican Comanche Wars

== Bibliography ==
- Garcia, Mario T. (1981). Desert Immigrants: The Mexicans of El Paso, 1880–1920. Yale University Press. ISBN 978-0-300-02520-0.
- Garza, Hedda (1994). Latinas: Hispanic women in the United States. University of New Mexico Press. ISBN 978-0-8263-2360-6.
- Johnson, Alfred S.; Clarence A. Bickford (1896). The Cyclopedic review of current history, Volume 6. Garretson, Cox & Co.
- Ruiz, Vicki; Virginia Sánchez Korrol (2005). Latina legacies: identity, biography, and community. Oxford University Press. ISBN 978-0-19-515399-6.
- Taibo II, P. I. (2013). Yaquis: Historia de una guerra popular y de un genocidio en México. Grupo Planeta Spain.
- Troncoso, Francisco P. (1905). Las guerras con las Tribus Yaqui y Mayo del estado de Sonora, Mexico. Mexico: Tipografia del departamento de estado mayor.
