= Cajemé =

Yaqui military leader in Mexico

Cajemé José María Leyba
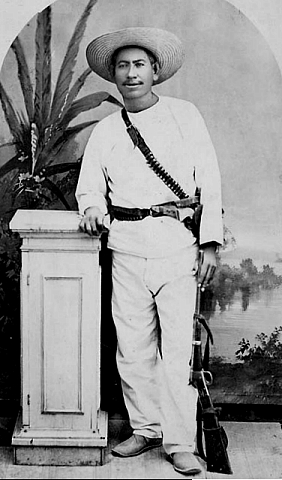
- Cajemé in April 1887, while under arrest and shortly before his execution
- Native name: Cajemé / Kahe'eme
- Born: José María Bonifacio Leyba Pérez; May 14, 1835; Hermosillo, Sonora, Mexico
- Died: April 23, 1887 (aged 51) Tres Cruces de Chumampaco
- Allegiance: Mexico; Yaquis
- Service years: 1854-1887
- Rank: Captain
- Conflicts: Second Franco-Mexican War; War of Reform; Yaqui Wars

Cajemé (born José María Bonifacio Leyba (Note: Sometimes spelled Leyva or Leiva.) Pérez, May 14, 1835 – April 23, 1887) was a Yaqui military leader in the Mexican state of Sonora. Cajemé or Kahe'eme means 'one who does not stop to drink [water]' in the Yaqui language and was originally a clan name, used by Cajemé's father.

== Biography ==
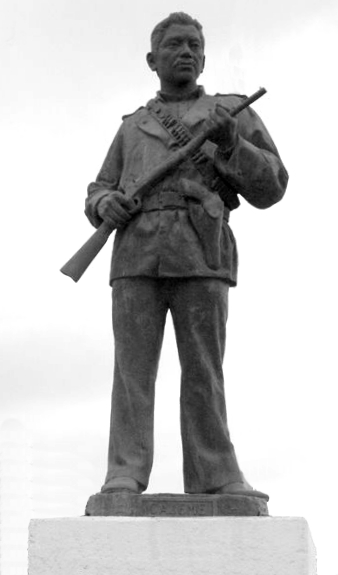
Statue of Cajemé erected in Ciudad Obregón, Sonora in 1985

Cajemé was born José María Bonifacio Leyba Perez on May 14, 1835, in Hermosillo, Sonora. His birthdate is often given as 1837, contrary to his birth and baptismal record, due to an initial error by his biographer Ramón Corral. Cajemé's father, Fernando (Note: Sometimes mistakenly called Francisco.) Leiva, was born in Hermosillo in 1798 and his mother, Juana Maria Peres, was born in Potam, Sonora.

=== California Gold Rush ===
At the age of 14, Cajemé accompanied his father, Fernando, and many other Yaqui people from Sonora, during the 1849 Gold Rush to Upper California. Cajemé and his father returned to Sonora about two years later. Cajemé seems to have learned English at that time, as well as having his first experience in defending himself against armed conflict. In spite of statements to the contrary, his father Fernando evidently did well in the gold fields, as his son was enrolled in an exclusive private school, the only school at the time in Guaymas, and one of only 20 schools in the State of Sonora in the 1850s. This was the Colegio Sonora operated by Cayetano Navarro, Prefect of Guaymas. Cajemé subsequently learned to read and write Spanish. Corral correctly states that Cajemé was 16 to 18 years of age during his time attending school, supporting the actual 1835 year of his birth.

=== Military Experience ===
Cajemé had his first taste of military battle in 1854, while serving with the "Urbanos," the local militia of Guaymas, which was organized by his teacher, Cayetano Navarro. This occurred when a plot to seize control of Sonora was carried out under the leadership of Count (Comte in French) Gaston de Raousset-Boulbon, who had two years earlier tried to seized the city of Hermosillo by force, and had been repelled in that attempt after they had captured Hermosillo.

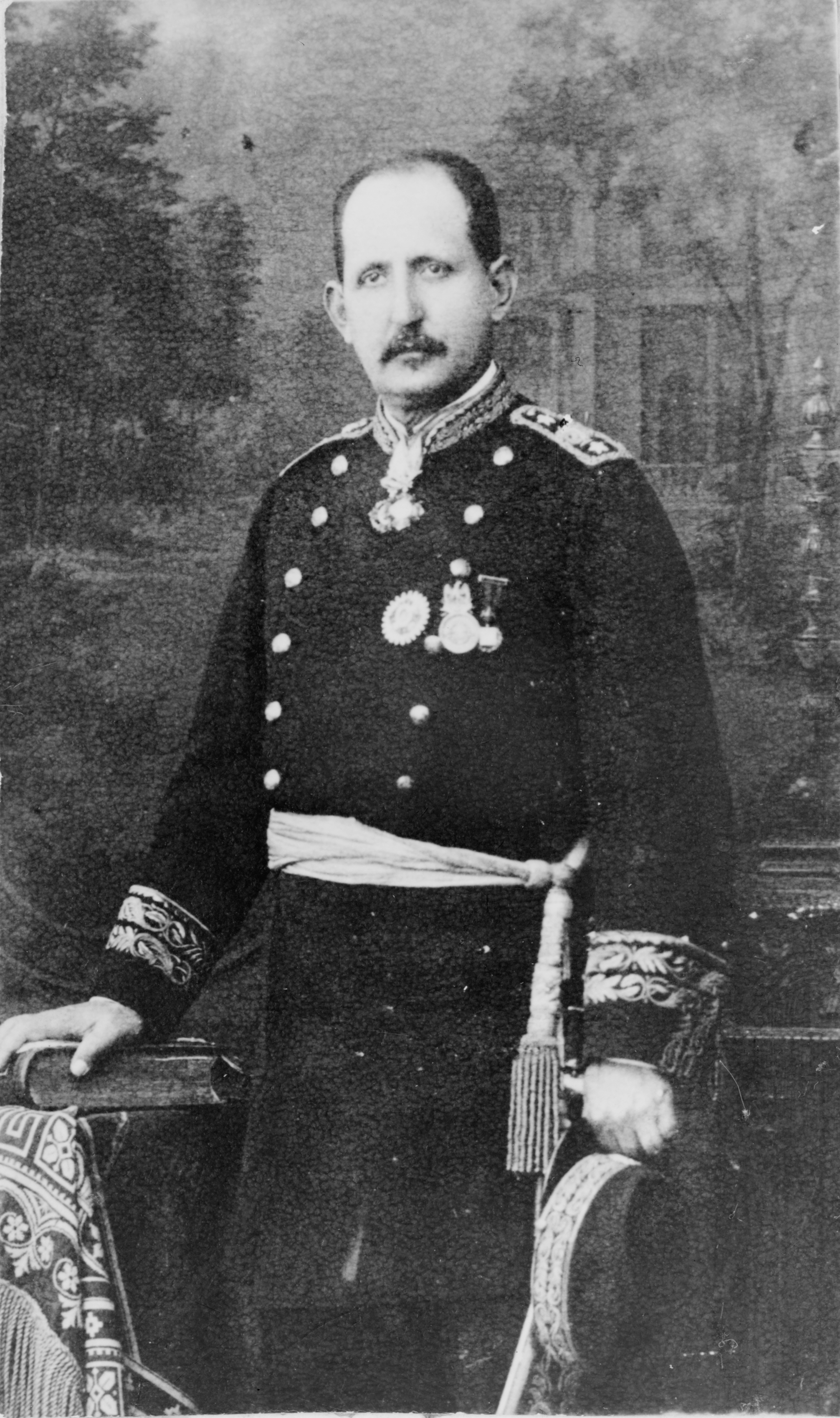
General Ramón Corona, c. 1888, under whom Cajemé began his military service

At 14:30 hours on July 13, 1854, the battle began, with the Count's forces attacking the defenders of the Guaymas town square. The attackers numbered more than 350 French, Germans and Chileans under the Count's leadership. After fighting the Mexican forces for about two hours, the invaders began to retreat. After seeing all of the men that Raousset-Boulbon had lost in the fighting, the French vice-consul, Joseph Calvo, came and requested his intervention to make peace. Calvo promised protection to all who took refuge under his flag, but hesitated for some time before extending this to include Raousset. Under the command of General José María Yáñez, the Urbanos and the other Mexican forces in Guaymas were victorious.

Raousset-Boulbon surrendered his army, asking for no other condition than to respect their lives. The surrender took place at 18:00 hours the same day, giving 313 prisoners being counted among them Count Raousset-Boulbon. The Mexican Army collected 310 rifles, 10 shotguns, 7 swords, 6 flags, a campaign banner and a forge. The losses suffered by both sides included 48 dead and 78 injured foreigners, with 19 dead and 57 wounded Mexican combatants. Gaston Rausset-Boulbon was sentenced to death, with the execution taking place in Guaymas, on August 12, 1854, in an area located in the north of the town square. Captain Francis M. Espino led the firing squad. See also de Collet La Madelène, 1876, pp. 266–304).

Now 18 years of age, Cajemé looked for new opportunities in life, and traveled to Tepic, where he worked for a short time as a blacksmith. Later, he was caught up in the draft for soldiers to serve in the regular army, the San Blas Battalion, but deserted after only three months of service. He fled to the mountains near Acaponeta, Nayarit, and worked for a while as a miner. With the Federal army still searching for him, he traveled to Mazatlán and joined a battalion comprising Pimas, Yaquis, and Opatas, that was part of the ranks of Pablo Lagarma, a Mexican insurgent, who had declared for constitutional restoration.

Not long afterward, Cajemé began service in as a trooper in the army of General Ramón Corona. Due to his previous military experience, and the ability to speak three languages, he was appointed aide-de-camp to General Corona. He ended up participating in the War of Reform, and against the forces of the French Intervention of Emperor Maximilian. It was General Corona that accepted the sword of surrender from Emperor Maximilian at Querétaro on 15 May 1867. Eventually, he came to serve in the forces under Ignacio L. Pesqueira, who came to value him as a competent, well educated and trilingual officer, and who eventually commissioned him as a captain in the cavalry.

=== Appointment as Alcalde Mayor ===
Having successfully served in the Mexican military in the war against the French occupation, Cajemé's service proved so exemplary that in 1872 he was appointed to the office of Alcalde Mayor of the Yaqui by then Sonora Governor Ignacio Pesqueira. Expected by Pesqueira to assist in pacifying the Yaqui people, he instead united the eight Yaqui pueblo into a small, independent republic and unexpectedly announced he would not recognize the Mexican government unless his people were allowed to independently govern themselves. Cajemé took on the role of a social reformer, he reorganized the administrative system of Yaqui society and life back to a state that had existed when there was far greater autonomy and self-sufficiency for the Yaqui people. This was based it to a large extent on the earlier Yaqui system (Mayors, Captains, Temastianes etc.). He re-established the popular assemblies, summoning them whenever it was necessary to rely on the entire population. Restructuring and disciplining Yaqui society to provide economic security and military preparedness, Cajemé instituted a system of taxation, and external trade control, initially establishing a tax on the ships that traded in the Yaqui River. To impose a toll on commercial traffic on its territory, in particular those who traded salt extracted from the coasts of the Yaqui nation, and to demand a premium from the cattle owners who the Yaquis stole cattle from, upon their return. All these economic sources allowed them to procure arms and ammunition, and also to develop agriculture, animal husbandry and fishing. This was all for the welfare and defense of the new nation against those that would take away the Yaqui's traditional lands.

=== Cajemé's Rebellion Against Mexican Authority ===
Due to Mexican government opposition to Yaqui self-government, Cajemé was forced to lead the Yaqui in a war against the Mexican state and those who sought to control and confiscate the traditional Yaqui lands. The war was long-lasting due to the skill of the Yaqui in battle under Cajemé's leadership, and was particularly brutal, with atrocities on both sides, but with a much larger-scale slaughter by the military forces of the Mexican government under President Porfirio Díaz.

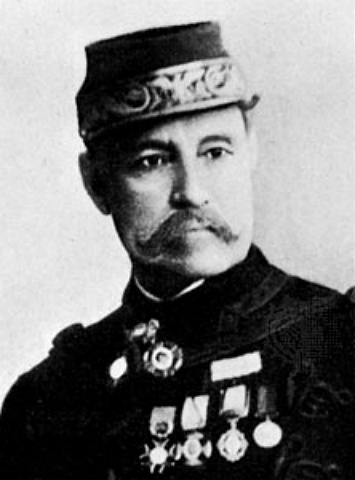
President Porfirio Diaz - c. 1887

General Ángel Martínez, c. 1900, who fought against the Yaquis

One of the many battles during this period was the Battle of Capetamaya, which took place on October 15, 1882. Cajemé, as he was now known, was holding a meeting with the indigenous Mayo in the vicinity of a place called Capetamaya in Sonora. Colonel Augustine Ortiz, who was a landowner in the area of the Mayo people, and who was also the brother of then governor of Sonora Carlos Ortiz, who had succeeded Pesqueira, attacked the assembly with elements of the Mexican Army. Ortiz reported that about Yaqui and Mayo 2,000 soldiers led by Cajemé faced his group of 300 men. The Yaqui's forces were scattered after losing 200 men, and Cajemé was wounded, losing part of his right index finger. The attack was seen by many as unnecessary, and led to public criticism against the new governor and his brother, which became so intense that it resulted in the dismissal of Carlos Ortiz as governor of Sonora

Cajemé, when traveling with his Yaqui soldiers, would often sing in Spanish at the head of his troops. Riding on a horse, he would hook his leg around the pommel of his saddle, and sing a song of bravery and lack of fear of the Mexican army. He would have two men with him, one on each side, and would be followed by approximately thirty more men on horseback, arranged in groups of ten, spaced some distance apart. Following at the rear of the column would be the infantry, composed of 100 or more troops.

In 1885, one of Cajemé's lieutenants, Loreto Molina, sought to gain control of the Yaqui people. With the support of the Mexican authorities, Molina developed an assassination plot to kill Cajemé at Cajemé's own home, at El Guamuchli, near Pótam. On the evening of 28 January 1885, Molina and twenty-two of his Yaqui supporters (some accounts state 30 or more) set out to kill Cajemé, but Cajemé was not at home, having left for the Mayo River with his bodyguard the day before. Cajemé stated that Molina's men looted his house, abused the women of the household by beating them with their weapons, and tearing off some of their clothes, and ran off Cajemé's family, leaving Cajemé's eight-year-old daughter on the bed in the house, while setting fire his house. One of Cajemé's sergeants saved the girl out of the flames of the fire, as the house burned to the ground. Among others named by Cajemé as participants in the attack. were the following men:

- Loreto Cuate
- Angél Cuchi
- Agustín Guapo
- Trenidad Guapo
- Francisco Guabesi
- Pancho Juchaji
- Martín Mobesbeo
- Modesto el panadero (the baker)
- hermano de (brother of) Modesto
- Lucio Nasario
- Antonio Ochocomasoleo
- Loreto Omocol
- Nacho Pelado
- Madaleno Quintero
- Luis Sanbaon
- Nacho Suboqui
- José Suple
- José Tolo
- Facundo Yorigelipe
- Ilario Yorigelipe
- Juan María Yorigelipe
- Liandra Yorigelipe

After Molina failed to kill Cajemé, the Mexican Government sent a force of three columns of 1200 men each to occupy the Yaqui territory. This force was originally under the command of Brigadier General Jose Guillermo Carbó (1841–1885), who had been appointed in 1881 as Commander of the First Military Zone comprising Sonora, Baja California, Sinaloa, and Tepic It was thought that this was an advantageous time to move against the Yaquis, as the situation was relatively calm. A military report on the first of September stated that Cajemé had dissolved his troops, and many indigenous people were approaching ranchos near the Yaqui River in search of work, while raids on ranchos had stopped. Also, there was optimism that the potential for disagreements between Cajemé and Anastasio Cuca, Cajemé's second in command, would increase, and that it would not be remote if a split occurred between them. However, before Carbó could lead the government forces into an engagement, he died of a massive cerebral hemorrhage on October 29, 1885. Following this, General Ángel Martínez known as "El Machetero" ("The Machete") was placed in control of these three columns.

General Marcos Carillo - Circa 1887

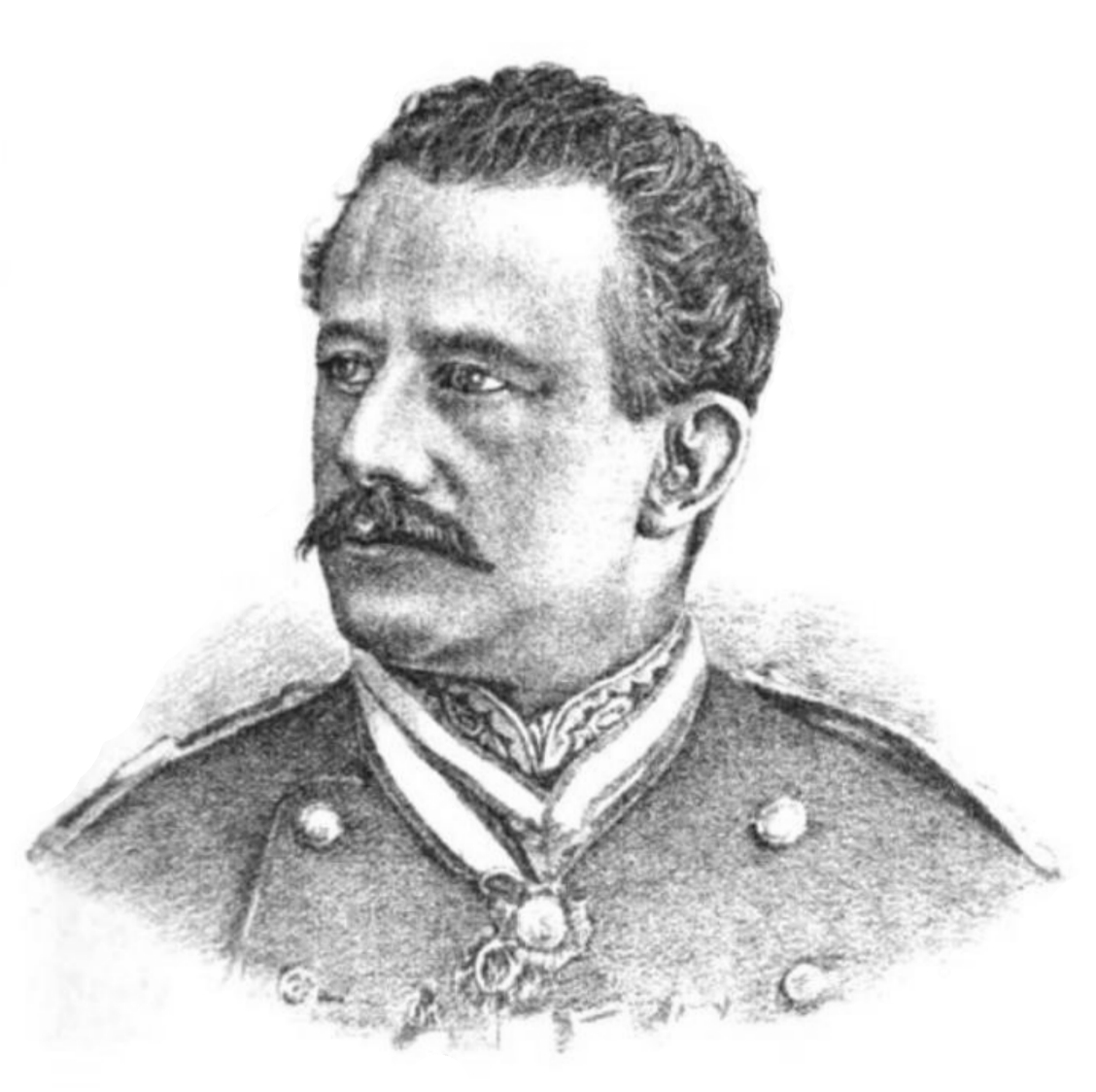
General Bonifacio Topete, c. 1890, defeated by Cajemé

Under General Martínez, the Mexican forces moved on the Yaqui River pueblos. Hubert Howe Bancroft relates (1888) how one of the columns was led by General Leiva (no relation to Cajemé) and General Marcos Carillo, and traveled west towards the Yaqui River Valley, carrying two mitrailleuse, which was the first machine gun used in major combat. Another was led by General Camano, and came from the south-east with two howitzers. A heavy body of cavalry came from the town of Buena Vista, from the north-east. General Martinez personally directed the occupation of the strategic Yaqui pueblo of Torím and other areas of the Yaqui River Valley from his headquarters at Barojica. General Bonifacio Topete eventually took control of a large part of the force and attempted to overrun a major fortification that the Yaqui built near Vícam. The fort, "El Añil" (The Indigo), was the first use of defensive warfare by Cajemé, and consisted of fences, parapets, and a moat surrounding the fortification. Although Topete's infantry force used cannons against the Yaqui forces in the attack, Topete was defeated with a loss of 20 men. Following this successful repulsion of the Mexican forces, Cajemé gave the order to his forces to fortify other locations and to fight only while behind trenches. In April 1886, the Mexican forces occupied the Yaqui town of Cócorit; and on May 5, 1886, a major siege was begun by the Mexican army at El Añil. By May 16, the Mexican army destroyed the fortification at El Añil, which was a great defeat for the Yaquis.

=== Betrayal ===
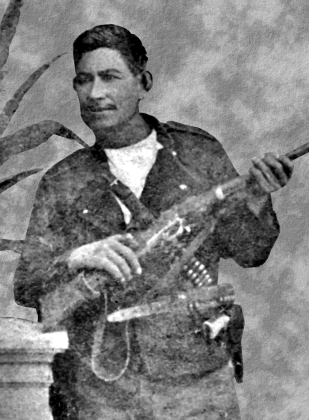
Cajemé in April 1887, photo taken during his arrest

Eventually, Cajemé was betrayed by a Yaqui woman, who was loyal to Loreto Molina, a Yaqui who was opposed to waging an insurgency against the Mexican government, as well as to other Yaquis opposed to resisting Mexican authority, Cajemé was captured while visiting family members in the pueblo of San José de Guaymas (about 8 miles north of the Port of Guaymas) on April 13, 1887. Cajemé was kept under house arrest by General Angel Martínez. He was treated with all of the respect and courtesy accorded to a defeated leader of a country while under arrest. Cajemé was extensively interviewed by Ramón Corral, who was elected Vice-Governor of Sonora on April 25, 1887, and who later became Governor of Sonora, eventually rising to the office of Vice President of Mexico under Porfirio Diaz. It was during this time that Cajemé's famous saying was recorded: "Antes como antes y ahora como ahora. Antes éramos enemigos y peleábamos, Ahora está Todo concluido y todos somos amigos (Before was before and now is now. Before we were enemies and we fought; now everything is concluded and all can be friends)" At least two photos were taken of Cajemé during his arrest, in both traditional Mexican campesino garb (as shown in the first photo), as well as in a dark blue military jacket that he was known to wear when fighting. In both photos he is seen holding a Carbine, and carrying a white-handled Colt revolver.

=== Execution ===
Demócrata - Circa 1897

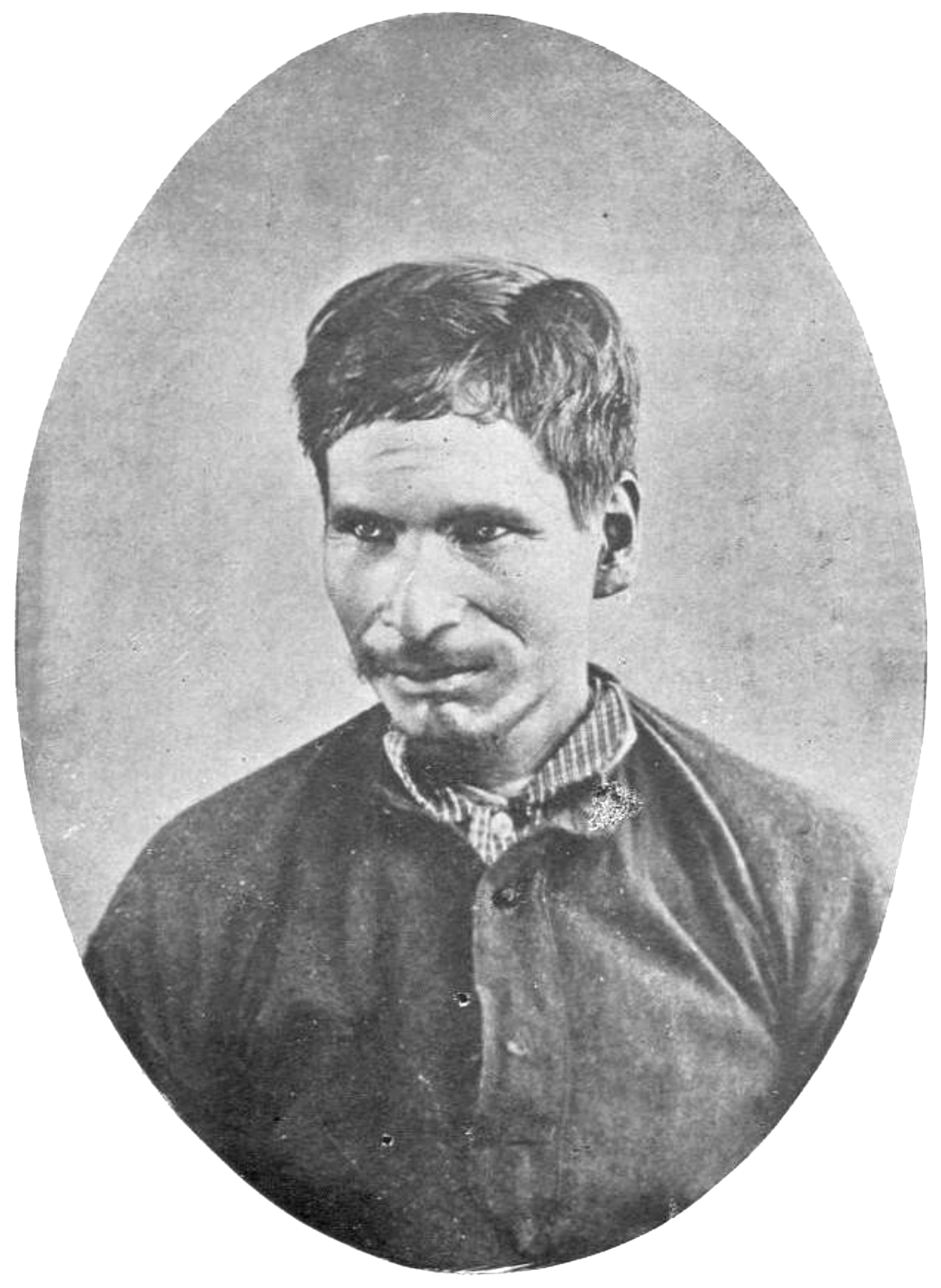
Anastasio Cuca - Circa May 1887

Following his interview, Cajemé was taken from Guaymas bay by the Demócrata, a steam-powered, coal-fired, iron-hulled, schooner-rigged gunboat, with one funnel and three masts, to the Yaqui River port of El Médano, near Pótam. Cajemé was then paraded through several of the Yaqui pueblos along the river, showing the people that the leader of the Yaqui had been captured. At eleven in the morning, on the return trip to Guaymas, a pretense was made that Cajemé was trying to escape his guard. He was shot seven times, causing his death at Tres Cruces de Chumampaco. An American reporter for the Tucson Daily Citizen (1887) visited the site of his death, and found Cajemé's hat was nailed to a tree, and a wooden cross inscribed with the following: "INRI, aque [sic] fallecio General Cajemé, Abril 23, 1887, a los 11 y 5 la manaña" (INRI Here died General Cajemé, April 23, 1887, at 11:05 in the morning).

Tres Cruces de Chumampaco in 1895, where Cajemé was killed

Cajemé's body was given to Tomás Durante, leader of the Yaqui people residing at Cócorit, and those Yaqui loyal to Cajemé reverently buried him at Cócorit. Following this incident, General Martinez ordered an investigation of the actions of his young Lieutenant, Clemente Patiño (born November 1861 who was in charge of the detachment that had escorted Cajemé.

=== Events Following Cajemé's Death ===
On 20 May 1887, Anastasio Cuca, Cajemé's second in command, was captured at Tucson, Arizona. He was extradited to Sonora at the request of Sonora Governor Tórres. Cuca was charged with murder and robbery in the District of Guaymas, and then taken to the Yaqui River and executed in front of his people. Afterward, Juan Maldonado Waswechia (Beltran), also known as Tetabiate (Tetaviecti, meaning "Rolling Stone" in the Yaqui or Yoeme language), took over in leading the fighting against the Mexican forces, becoming Cajemé's successor in June 1887 By this time, the devastation to the Yaqui population along the Yaqui river was great. At the direction of the Government of Sonora, a count was taken of the number of indigenous inhabitants still living in the Yaqui Pueblos of Cócorit, Tórim, and El Médano in late 1887. The count showed that there were only 1784 men and 2200 women still living in the three towns.

For many years following Cajemé's death there were strenuous efforts by the Mexican government to kill or remove all the Yaqui from the state of Sonora. Much of the Yaqui nation was illegally enslaved and sent to work as slave laborers in the Yucatán Peninsula, in the Quintana Roo, where thousands died laboring in the henequen plantations. Many more were simply killed, usually by firing squad or by hanging. Many Yaqui fled to neighboring Mexican states, submerging their identity with that of other Indian groups. Quite a few Yaqui fled to Southern Arizona, the traditional Northernmost region of their territory, where many of their descendants live today.

=== Cajemé's families ===
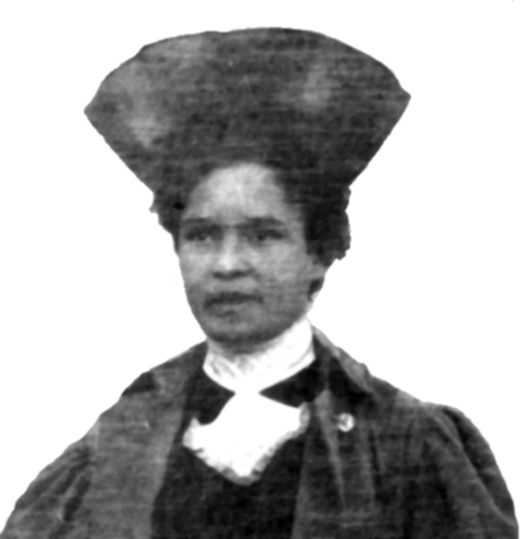
María Salgado Ramires, first wife of Cajemé, taken circa 1894

It is known that Cajemé was married at least two times. His first wife was María Jesus Salgado Ramires. It appears that this was a traditional Yaqui marriage, as it does not appear to be recorded in the historic Roman Catholic Church records. Cajemé and María had two children, both born in Hermosillo: a son, Sotero Emiliano Leiva Salgado, born in 1863, and a daughter, Victoria Leiva Salgado, born in 1866 Mexican newspaper articles mention Cajemé's son from this marriage leading Yaqui soldiers in the fight against the Mexican forces, or fighting alongside his father in the years 1885 and 1886, as well as his daughter leading some raids. His last appearance in the historical record that has been located is on May 4, 1889, where Emiliano Leiva is listed as a Padrino at the baptism of his sister, Victoria Leiva's, first child. Victoria was in 1885 noted (but not by name) as the daughter of Cajemé (Newark Daily Advocate, 1885). Victoria married a well-known businessman from Montmorenci, Indiana, in the United States, named William E. Godman. Godman was working as a "ferrocarrilero," and had been living in Sonora since 1884. The marriage took place in Guaymas, on December 17, 1887, at the home of Don Antonio Moreno, a Senator from Sonora who was largely responsible for pushing through the development of the Sonora Railway. The marriage occurred just eight months after the death of Cajemé. With the aide of her husband William, Victoria, along with her mother María, and her older brother Emiliano, were able to escape the continued persecution of the Yaqui people in Sonora. Godman and his family traveled first to the state of Chihuahua. The family returned to Sonora in 1892, and finally, in January 1900, entered the United States of America at El Paso, Texas, not long after the infamous massacre of Yaquis at Mazocoba, in the heart of the Bacatete Mountains of Sonora. Godman eventually left Victoria and his daughters in El Paso and re-married. At the start of the Mexican Revolution Godman relocated to Puerto Barrios, Guatemala, where he accepted a position as Port Superintendent for the International Railways of Central America (I.R.C.A.), a subsidiary of the United Fruit Company. Victoria died on August 5, 1946, in Los Angeles, California, having had four children and four grandchildren.

Cajemé's second marriage was to María Jesús Maccima Matus Morales on June 14, 1878, recorded at San Fernando, Guaymas, Sonora. Dolores Salgado, the father of Cajemé's first wife, was one of the godparents (padrinos) of María Jesús Maccima Matus Morales at the time of her baptism on November 20, 1842. There were at least two children born to this union, the youngest being a son ("joven,"), and also a daughter. This family appears to be the one that Loreto Molina and his followers ran off, burning their home near Pótam in 1885.

=== Municipality of Cajeme ===
Following the death of Cajemé, the Yaqui struggled to maintain control of their traditional lands. However, by 1890, with most of the Yaqui removed from the Yaqui River Valley, the Mexican government granted the Sonora and Sinaloa Irrigation Company, incorporated in New Jersey, land along the river with water rights in 1890. The company begin the construction of canals for irrigating and growing crops. The Sonora and Sinaloa Irrigation Company soon went bankrupt, and the grant was purchased by the Richardson Construction Company of California in 1906. The Richardson Construction Company sold a 400 hectare block of land to developers from the United States and Europe, and received the exclusive right to sixty-five percent of the Yaqui River’s water for a 99-year period. The first non-indigenous settlers established themselves in the neighborhood called Plano Oriente. The Ferrocarril Sud-Pacífico, a subsidy of the Southern Pacific Railroad, established a station nearby called Cajeme, to provide water for the locomotives. The town of Cajeme was initially a part of Cócorit Municipality until its elevation to a Municipal Seat on September 28, 1927. The first city government was established on January 1, 1928. The July 28, 1928, decree stated that “the city is known now with the name of Ciudad Obregón, the town formerly known as Cajeme.” In 1937 another legislation stated that Cajeme be the name of the Municipality and Ciudad Obregón its seat.

In modern times, the Municipality of Cajeme yearly commemorates the death of Cajemé, with a gathering and public speeches highlighting the battles where Cajemé led his people against the Mexican Government, instead of pacifying the Yaqui people as was expected by Sonoran Governor Pesqueira.

== Bibliography ==
- Archivo General del Registro Civil del Estado de Sonora. (1887). Copias de Actas de Matrimonio. (In Spanish). Guaymas. pp. 95–97.
- Bancroft, H. H. (1888). History of Mexico, Vol. VI. San Francisco: The History Company. p. 462
- Berber, Laureano Calvo. (1958). Nociones de historia de Sonora. (In Spanish). México City: Libreria de Manuel Porrua, S A.
- Corral, Ramón. (1887). José María Leyva Cajeme: Apuntes Biográficos. A serial article published in several issues of La Constitución (Periódico oficial del gobierno del estado libre y soberano de Sonora), beginning with the issue of April 22, 1887 (Tomo IX, Num. 16), and ending July 8, 1887 (Tomo IX, Num. 28). (In Spanish). Hermosillo, Sonora, Mexico.
- Corral, Ramón. (1959 [1900]). Biografía de José María Leyva Cajeme. In Obras históricas. Reseña histórica del Estado de Sonora, 1856-1877; Las razas indígenas de Sonora. No. I. (In Spanish). Hermosillo, Sonora, Mexico, Retrato del autor. (Biblioteca Sonorense de Geografía e Historia) [Note: This is the second printing of this book, which was originally published in 1900. It was republished in 1959 as part of a State series on the geography and history of Sonora]
- Diccionario Porrúa de Historia, Biografía, Geografía de México, 2 Vols. (1970) (In Spanish). Mexico: Porrúa. Vol. 1, p. 360.
- de Collet La Madelène, Joseph Henri. (1876). Le comte Gaston de Raousset-Boulbon, sa vie et ses aventures: d'pres ses papiers et sa correspondance. (In French). Paris: Charpentier et Cie, Libraires Éditeurs.
- El Siglo Diez y Nueve. (1851). Estado de Sonora, Ures, Mayo 25. June 25, 1851. p. 604.
- Garcia, Lorenzo. (1885). Carta de Lorenzo Garcia a Porfirio Diaz, Hemosillo, 1 de Septiembre de 1885. Archivo Porfirio Diaz, legajo 10, caja 19, documento 009,024. (In Spanish).
- Gouy-Gilbert, Cécile (1983). Une résistance indienne. Les Yaquis du Sonora. (In French) Lyon, France: Les Éditions Fédérop.
- Hernández, Fortunato. (1902). Las razas indígenas de Sonora y la guerra del yaqui. (In Spanish). Mexico: J. de Elizalde.
- Iglesia Católica. (1798). Registros parroquiales: Bautismos 1783-1828, (In Spanish) La Asunción; Hermosillo, Sonora, Mexico. In "FHL INTL Film 668931," Microfilme de manuscritos en el archivo de la parroquia; La Asunción fue titular de la catedral metropolitana de la diócesis de Hermosillo. Salt Lake City, Utah : Filmado por la Sociedad Genealógica de Utah, 1968.
- Iglesia Católica. (1815). Registros parroquiales: Bautismos 1783-1828, (In Spanish) La Asunción; Hermosillo, Sonora, Mexico. In "FHL INTL Film 668931," Microfilme de manuscritos en el archivo de la parroquia; La Asunción fue titular de la catedral metropolitana de la diócesis de Hermosillo. Salt Lake City, Utah : Filmado por la Sociedad Genealógica de Utah, 1968.
- Iglesia Católica. (1835). Libro de Bautistos 1835, Registro 1433, (In Spanish) Catedral De La Asunción Metropolitana; Hermosillo, Sonora, Mexico [Note: The volume containing this record has not yet been microfilmed].
- Iglesia Católica. (1842). Registros parroquiales: Bautismos 1837-1847, (In Spanish) La Asunción; Hermosillo, Sonora, Mexico. In " FHL INTL Film 668933," Microfilme de manuscritos en el archivo de la parroquia; La Asunción fue titular de la catedral metropolitana de la diócesis de Hermosillo. Salt Lake City, Utah : Filmado por la Sociedad Genealógica de Utah, 1968.
- Iglesia Católica. (1857). Registros parroquiales: Bautismos 1857-1860, (In Spanish) La Asunción; Hermosillo, Sonora, Mexico. In " FHL INTL Film 671285," Microfilme de manuscritos en el archivo de la parroquia; La Asunción fue titular de la catedral metropolitana de la diócesis de Hermosillo. Salt Lake City, Utah : Filmado por la Sociedad Genealógica de Utah, 1968.
- Iglesia Católica. (1861). Registros parroquiales: Bautismos 1853-1866, (In Spanish) Ocotlán, Jalisco, Mexico. In " FHL INTL Film 280864," Microfilme de manuscritos en el archivo de la parroquia. Salt Lake City, Utah : Filmado por la Sociedad Genealógica de Utah, 1958.
- Iglesia Católica. (1863). Registros parroquiales: Bautismos 1860-1865, (In Spanish) La Asunción; Hermosillo, Sonora, Mexico. In " FHL INTL Film 671286," Microfilme de manuscritos en el archivo de la parroquia; La Asunción fue titular de la catedral metropolitana de la diócesis de Hermosillo. Salt Lake City, Utah : Filmado por la Sociedad Genealógica de Utah, 1968.
- Iglesia Católica. (1866). Registros parroquiales: Bautismos 1865-1869, (In Spanish) La Asunción; Hermosillo, Sonora, Mexico. In " FHL INTL Film 671288," Microfilme de manuscritos en el archivo de la parroquia; La Asunción fue titular de la catedral metropolitana de la diócesis de Hermosillo. Salt Lake City, Utah : Filmado por la Sociedad Genealógica de Utah, 1968.
- Iglesia Católica. (1878). Registros parroquiales: Matrimonios 1877-1951 , (In Spanish) San Fernando; Guaymas, Sonora, Mexico. In " FHL INTL Film 671288," Microfilme de manuscritos en el archivo de la parroquia. Salt Lake City, Utah : Filmado por la Sociedad Genealógica de Utah, 1968.
- Iglesia Católica. (1881). Registros parroquiales: Matrimonios 1869-1889, (In Spanish) San Francisco; Tala, Jalisco, Mexico. In " FHL INTL Film 233402," Microfilme de manuscritos en el archivo de la parroquia. Salt Lake City, Utah : Filmado por la Sociedad Genealógica de Utah, 1959.
- Iglesia Católica. (1889). Registros parroquiales, 1709-1957, Bautismos 1884-1893, (In Spanish) Iglesia Católica. Sagrario; Chihuahua, Chihuahua, Mexico. In " FHL INTL Film 162671," Microfilme de manuscritos en el Archivo Historico de la Arquidiocesis de Chihuahua. Salt Lake City, Utah : Filmado por la Sociedad Genealógica de Utah, 1957.
- Hillary, Frank M. (1967). "Cajeme, and the Mexico of His Time". The Journal of Arizona History. 8 (2): 120–136. JSTOR 41695415.
- Hu-Dehart, Evelyn (1974). "Development and Rural Rebellion: Pacification of the Yaquis in the Late Porfiriato". Hispanic American Historical Review. 54 (1): 72–93. doi:10.1215/00182168-54.1.72. ISSN 0018-2168.
- La Constitucion. (1885). Los sublevados. (In Spanish). Mexico City, Mexico. March 20, 1885, p. 4.
- La Constitucion. (1886). Mas del Yaqui. (In Spanish). Mexico City, Mexico. May 21, 1886, p. 3
- Los Angeles Herald. (1887). Captive Cuca: Executed for His Crimes In Sonora, Mexico. Volume 27, Number 80, 24 June 1887. p. 1
- Molina, José. (1983). Historia de Hermosillo antiguo: En memoria del aniversario doscientos de haber recibido el título de Villa del Pitic. (In Spanish). México DF.: Fuentes Impresores S.A. Centeno 109.
- Moreno, Antonio. (1880). Enclosure 4, Circular No. 1014.: Reply to Ochoa's Report. In Executive Documents of the House of Representatives. Second Session of the Forty Sixth Congress, 1879-1880. Foreign Relations, Vol. 1, Part 1. Washington: Government Printing Office. pp. 831–833.
- Municipio de Cajeme. (2013). ''Conmemoran autoridades el 125 aniversario luctuoso de José María Leyva'' (In Spanish). April 25, 2013.
- Newark Daily Advocate. (1885). A troublesome Indian race. Newark, Ohio. June 10, 1885. See also: A troublesome Indian race. The Mitchell Daily Republican. Mitchell, South Dakota. June 26, 1885. [Note: this was a widely syndicated article at the time. The two citations given are among the easiest to locate.]
- N.Y. Times. (1887). The Sonora Election. April 27, 1887.
- N.Y. Times. (1900). New York Bondholders Win: Mexican Court Grants Foreclosure Against Sonora Irrigation Co. December 22, 1900.
- N.Y. Times. (1901). Mexico Company in Trouble. June 25, 1901.
- Otero, Jose. (1885). Carta de Jose Otero a Porfirio Diaz, 10 de Septiembre de 1885. (In Spanish). Archivo Porfirio Diaz. legajo 10, caja 19, documenta 009,379.
- Phillips, Steven J., & Comus, Patricia Wentworth. (2000). A natural history of the Sonoran Desert. Tucson, Arizona: Arizona-Sonora Desert Museum Press.
- Radding, Cynthia (1989). "Peasant Resistance on the Yaqui Delta: An Historical Inquiry into the Meaning of Ethnicity". Journal of the Southwest. 31 (3): 330–3611. ISSN 0894-8410. JSTOR 40169690.
- Records of the Compañia Constructora Richardson, S.A. (1904-1968). Arizona-Sonora Document Online.
- Scroggs, William O. (1916). Filibusters and Financiers; the story of William Walker and his Associates. New York, New York: The Macmillan company.
- Sheridan, Thomas E. (1988). "How to Tell the Story of a "People without History": Narrative versus Ethnohistorical Approaches to the Study of the Yaqui Indians through Time". Journal of the Southwest. 30 (2): 168–189. ISSN 0894-8410. JSTOR 40169601.
- Spicer, Edward Holland. (1988). People of Pascua. Tucson, AZ: University of Arizona Press.
- Troncoso, Francisco P. Francisco de Borja del Paso y Troncoso (1905). Las guerras con las Tribus Yaqui y Mayo del estado de Sonora, Mexico. (In Spanish). Mexico: Tipografia del departamento de estado mayor.
- Tucson Daily Citizen.(1887). May 25, 1887.
- Turner, John Kenneth. (1911). Mexico: An Indictment of a Cruel and Corrupt System. Chicago: Charles H. Kerr & Company. [Note: This is probably the best and most famous English language exposé of the Yaqui situation in Mexico during the early 20th century.]
- Vandervort, Bruce. (2006). Indian wars of Mexico, Canada and the United States, 1812-1900. New York: Routledge.
- Zoontjens, Linda, & Glenlivet, Yaomi. (2007). A brief history of the Yaqui and their land.
