= Battle of Cerro del Gallo =

1927 armed conflict in Mexico

- Part of the Yaqui Wars
| Date | 28 April 1927 |
| Location | Guanajuato, Guanajuato, Mexico |
| Result | Mexican Victory |

Belligerents
| Mexico | Yaqui |

Commanders and leaders
| (Mexico) Álvaro Obregón (Mexico) Francisco Manzo | Luis Matius |

Casualties and losses
| Unknown | Unknown killed 415 captured |

The Battle of Cerro del Gallo was a somewhat large engagement fought in 1927 between federal Mexican forces and a band of Yaquis near the mountains of Guanajuato. This was one of the last major battles of the Yaqui Wars.

== Battle ==
On April 28, 1927, Mexican newspaper, El Universal, reported that Yaquis had withdrawn from mountains near Cerro del Gallo. In response, Mexico decided to conduct a major offensive against them. Operations would be directed by general Álvaro Obregón, assisted by the general Francisco Manzo. Thus leading towards the battle and the capture of 415 Yaquis. following the Yaquis defeat, Mexico had establish garrison on Yaqui pueblos and villages. With the newly formed Mexican Air Force, Mexico had bombed and gas Yaqui positions on mountains. On October 2, 1927, Manzo had expected Luis Matius, the Yaqui chieftain, to surrender after holding onto the Bacatete Mountains for a year.

== See also ==
- Mexican Air Force
- Battle of Bear Valley
- Yaqui Uprising
