= Bácum Municipality =

Coordinates: 27.5111°N 110.1088°W

Bácum
- Municipality
- Coat of arms
- Interactive map of Bácum
- Country: Mexico
- State: Sonora
- Municipal seat: Bácum

Area
  - Total: 1,409.7 km^{2} (544.3 sq mi)

Population (2020)
  - Total: 23,151
  - Density: 14.66/km^{2} (38.0/sq mi)
- Time zone: UTC–07:00 (Zona Pacífico)
- Website: bacum.gob.mx

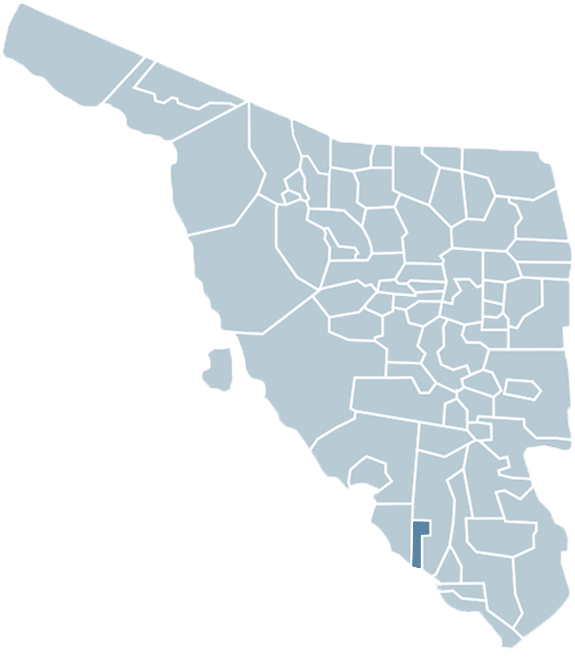
Locator map of the municipality of Bácum in southwestern Sonora.

Bácum is a municipality of southwestern Sonora, in northwestern Mexico. The population was 23,151 in 2020.

== Geography ==
The municipality of Bácum is located in one of the two valleys of the Yaqui River. The area of the municipality is 1,409.7 km^{2} (544.3 mi^{2}) It is bounded by the municipalities of Cajeme in the east and Guaymas in the west — and the Gulf of California in the south.

Municipal seat

The municipal seat is the town of Bácum.

The municipality lies next to the large urban center of Ciudad Obregón in Cajeme.

== Yaqui Indians ==
The indigenous community is very large, with more than 9,000 residents identified as Yaqui in the 2000 census.

== Economy ==
The municipality's main economic activity is intensive agriculture, with more than 300 square kilometers under irrigation by canal. The Yaqui River's water is used for irrigation in a system of canals. The main crops are wheat, corn, soybeans, barley, cotton, and garden vegetables, as well as seasonal crops such as alfalfa and some fruits.

The coastline in the south is 12 kilometres (7.5 mi) long. Some fishing is practiced. Industries are small, and consist chiefly of packing houses for vegetables and liquid fertilizer production.

== See also ==
- Bácum town
- Bataconcica
- Spanish missions in the Sonoran Desert
- Municipalities of Sonora
