= Santiago Domínguez =

Mexican boxer

Personal information
- Nickname: Somer
- Born: 9 October 1991 (age 34) Ciudad Obregón, Sonora, Mexico
- Height: 5 ft 8 in (173 cm)
- Weight: Light welterweight; Welterweight

Boxing career

Boxing record
- Total fights: 28
- Wins: 27
- Win by KO: 20
- Losses: 1

Santiago Ernesto Domínguez Servín (born 9 October 1991) is a Mexican professional boxer. He has held the WBC-USNBC Silver and WBC FECARBOX welterweight titles since 2019.

== Early life ==
Domínguez compiled a 62–4 record (36 KO) as an amateur, with his strict father keeping him and his younger brother Marcos in the gym and away from trouble on the streets of Ciudad Obregón, Sonora.

== Professional career ==
Domínguez made his professional debut on 22 August 2014, defeating Arturo Camargo with a first-round TKO in his hometown of Ciudad Obregón. After winning his first 11 bouts, he faced Jorge Valenzuela for the vacant ABO Americas super lightweight title on 13 July 2018 in Ensenada. Fighting on the same card as his younger brother, he beat Valenzuela by way of unanimous decision for his first minor belt.

On 30 May 2019, Domínguez defeated compatriot Jorge Rodríguez in Phoenix, his first fight outside of Mexico, earning him a shot at the vacant WBC FECARBOX welterweight title. He beat Noé Núñez four weeks later in Ciudad Obregón for the belt, again fighting on the same night as his brother. He then fought Tanzanian veteran Fabian Lyimo in San Diego, stopping him in the second round with repeated hooks to the body for his 19th consecutive victory.

Domínguez won the vacant WBC–USNBC Silver welterweight title on 7 November 2019, knocking out Uzbekistani challenger Ravshan Hudaynazarov in just 43 seconds in Tucson, Arizona. In December, it was announced that he would be defending his belt the following month against Brazilian Vitor Jones Freitas in the co-featured event of a Roy Jones Jr. Promotions card. However, Domínguez fell ill and the fight was scrapped at the last minute.

== Professional boxing record ==
28 fights	27 wins	1 loss
By knockout	20	0
By decision	7	1

No.	Result	Record	Opponent	Type	Round, time	Date	Location	Notes
28	Loss	27-1	Alexis Rocha	UD	10	19 July 2024	Fantasy Springs, Indio, California, U.S.	For WBO NABO Welterweight Title
27	Win	27–0	(United States) Jose Luis Sanchez	SD	10	30 Mar 2024	(United States) YouTube Theater, Inglewood, California, U.S.	
26	Win	26–0	(Nicaragua) Nolberto Casco	KO	2 (8), 0:44	4 Nov 2023	Polideportivo de Cartago, Cartago, Costa Rica	
25	Win	25–0	(Mexico) Jesús Antonio Rubio	TKO	5 (10), 1:03	15 Oct 2021	Auditorio Benito Juárez, Los Mochis, Mexico	Won vacant WBC Latino welterweight title
24	Win	24–0	(Mexico) Ricardo Lara	SD	10	10 Dec 2020	Marinaterra Hotel Spa, Guaymas, Mexico	
23	Win	23–0	(Mexico) José Rosario Cazarez	TKO	3 (10), 2:52	26 Sep 2020	Centro de Usos Multiples, Cócorit, Mexico	
22	Win	22–0	(Mexico) Adalberto Borquez	TKO	1 (10), 2:49	25 Aug 2020	Marinaterra Hotel Spa, Guaymas, Mexico	Retained WBC FECARBOX welterweight title
21	Win	21–0	(Mexico) José Guadalupe Rosales	SD	8	29 Feb 2020	Palenque de la Expo, Ciudad Obregón, Mexico	
20	Win	20–0	(Uzbekistan) Ravshan Hudaynazarov	KO	1 (8), 0:43	7 Nov 2019	(United States) Casino del Sol, Tucson, Arizona, U.S.	Won vacant WBC–USNBC Silver welterweight title
19	Win	19–0	(Tanzania) Fabian Lyimo	TKO	2 (8), 2:28	24 Aug 2019	(United States) Viejas Casino, Alpine, California, U.S.	
18	Win	18–0	(Mexico) Noé Núñez	TKO	8 (10), 0:57	28 Jun 2019	Palenque de la Expo, Ciudad Obregón, Mexico	Won vacant WBC FECARBOX welterweight title
17	Win	17–0	(Mexico) Jorge Rodríguez	TKO	7 (8), 1:05	30 May 2019	(United States) Phoenix, Arizona, U.S.	
16	Win	16–0	(Mexico) Carlos Urias	KO	2 (8), 1:28	29 Mar 2019	Gimnasio Solidaridad, Hermosillo, Mexico	
15	Win	15–0	(Mexico) Ulises Pérez	RTD	5 (8), 3:00	14 Dec 2018	Palenque de la Expo, Ciudad Obregón, Mexico	
14	Win	14–0	(Mexico) Daniel Armando Valenzuela	TKO	4 (8), 1:47	28 Sep 2018	Palenque de la Expo, Ciudad Obregón, Mexico	
13	Win	13–0	(Mexico) Adrian Reyes	KO	3 (6), 2:03	15 Aug 2018	Arena Big Star Boxing, Guasave, Mexico	
12	Win	12–0	(Mexico) Jorge Valenzuela	UD	8	13 Jul 2018	Plaza Pueblo Antiguo, Ensenada, Mexico	Won vacant ABO Americas super lightweight title
11	Win	11–0	(Mexico) Carlos Bacasegua Luzania	TKO	4 (8), 0:33	2 Sep 2017	Arena ITSON, Ciudad Obregón, Mexico	
10	Win	10–0	(Mexico) Christian Gilberto Pacheco	TKO	2 (8), 2:06	14 Jul 2017	Salón "Alameda" Hotel El Paseo, Ciudad Juárez, Mexico	
9	Win	9–0	(Mexico) Ramón Barajas	UD	6	1 Apr 2017	Arena Jalisco, Guadalajara, Mexico	
8	Win	8–0	(Mexico) Luis Alfonso Bojórquez	TKO	2 (6), 0:58	3 Mar 2017	Centro de Usos Múltiples, Huatabampo, Mexico	
7	Win	7–0	(Mexico) Pedro Amigon	RTD	5 (6), 3:00	30 Sep 2016	Palenque de la Expo, Ciudad Obregón, Mexico	
6	Win	6–0	(Mexico) Octavio Ochoa	KO	1 (6), 1:30	30 Apr 2016	Palenque de la Expo, Ciudad Obregón, Mexico	
5	Win	5–0	(Mexico) Juan Carlos García	UD	6	18 Dec 2015	Palenque de la Expo, Ciudad Obregón, Mexico	
4	Win	4–0	(Mexico) Joel Arredondo	TKO	3 (4), 2:41	31 Oct 2015	Palenque de la Expo, Ciudad Obregón, Mexico	
3	Win	3–0	(Mexico) Ángel Zombrano	KO	3 (4), 0:43	4 Sep 2015	Palenque de la Expo, Ciudad Obregón, Mexico	
2	Win	2–0	(Mexico) Jesús Alejandro Ramos	SD	4	7 Feb 2015	Gimnasio Manuel Lira, Ciudad Obregón, Mexico	
1	Win	1–0	(Mexico) Arturo Camargo	TKO	1 (4), 1:30	22 Aug 2014	Gimnasio Municipal, Ciudad Obregón, Mexico	

== Personal life ==
Domínguez now resides in Fort Worth, Texas.

Sporting positions
Regional boxing titles
Vacant Title last held by Thomas LaManna	WBC FECARBOX welterweight champion 28 June 2019 – 27 July 2019; Vacated	Vacant Title next held by Juan Pablo Romero
Vacant Title last held by Anthony Young	WBC–USNBC Silver welterweight champion 7 November 2019 – present	Incumbent
