= Tetabiate =

Mexican rebel (1857–1901)

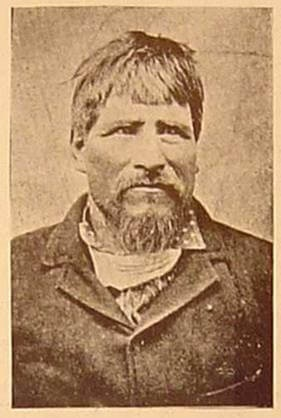

Tetabiate (Tetaviecti, meaning "Rolling Stone" in the Yaqui or Yoeme language), also known as Juan Maldonado Waswechia Beltran (28 August 1857 – 9 July 1901), was the leader of the Yaqui resistance to Mexican attempts to destroy their society and incorporate them fully into the Mexican state after the execution of Cajemé in 1887.

Tetabiate was the son of Pablo Maldonado and Felipa Beltran, and was born in Hermosillo, Sonora, Mexico. He was baptized at the Catedral de la Asunción, in Hermosillo, on August 31, 1857 (Iglesia Católica, 1857).

Following the death of Cajeme on April 23, 1887, Tetabiate led the Yaqui nation for the next 14 years in a guerrilla war against the Porfirio government of Mexico. He was killed on July 9, 1901, in the Bacatete Mountains of Sonora, while fighting against Mexican forces under the command of Loreto Villa (Chief of Yaqui Falls Fighting, 1901). It was reported that the son of Tetabiate, Guillermo, continued the fight against the Mexican forces after his father's death (Mexico's Yaqui War, 1902).

== Sources ==
- Edward H. Spicer. (1962). Cycles of Conquest. Tucson: University of Arizona Press.
- Chief of Yaqui Falls Fighting. (1901). Los Angeles Herald. Vol. 28, Number 304, 31 July 1901. p. 14.
- Iglesia Católica. (1857). Registros parroquiales: Bautismos Bautismos 1857–1860, La Asunción; Hermosillo, Sonora, Mexico. In " FHL INTL Film 671285," Microfilme de manuscritos en el archivo de la parroquia; La Asunción fue titular de la catedral metropolitana de la diócesis de Hermosillo. Salt Lake City, Utah : Filmado por la Sociedad Genealógica de Utah, 1968.
- Mexico's Yaqui War Result of Labor Troubles. (1902). The Denver Republican. 13 July 1902. p. 17
- Palemón Zavala Castro. (1991). El indio Tetabiate y la nación de los Ocho Pueblos del Río Yaqui = Ju-u io-eme Teta-biacti into jiac bat-ue u-oi naiqui pueplotam nacionata. Hermosillo, Sonora: Instituto Sonorense de Cultura.
