= Ángel Martínez (general) =

Mexican general (1837–1904)

- Martínez in 1900

Governor of San Luis Potosí
- In office 25 November 1876 – 14 December 1876
- Preceded by: Buenaventura Ortíz
- Succeeded by: Manuel Sánchez Rivera

Personal details
- Born: c. 1837 Arandas, Jalisco, Mexico
- Died: May 22, 1904 (aged 66–67) Colima City, Colima, Mexico
- Nickname: Machetero

Military service
- Allegiance: Mexico; North German Confederation
- Branch: Mexican Army; Prussian Army
- Years of service: 1856 – 1871; 1876 – 1889
- Rank: Brigade General
- Battles/wars: Reform War; Second Franco–Mexican War; Battle of Guadalupe; Franco-Prussian War; Siege of Paris; Yaqui Wars

Ángel Martínez, also known as the Machetero or El Machete, was a Mexican general during the 19th century. He had a prominent military career during the Second French intervention in Mexico, being a key commander across the state of Colima. He was also a major figure of the Yaqui Wars, notably ordering the execution of Cajemé.

== Early military career ==
He was born in the state of Jalisco in 1837, but his home city remains disputed as his service record states he was born in Arandas while his death certificate states that he was born in Ayo el Chico of the same canton. When he was young, he settled in the city of Tepic and began his military career on September 2, 1856 as a sergeant of the National Guard. He was within the ranks of Colonel Ramón Corona to fight Manuel Lozada he was promoted to second lieutenant on October 26, 1858, lieutenant on November 12, 1859 and to captain on October 20, 1862, on which date he proceeded to organize the "guerrilla" of his name to fight against the Second French intervention in Mexico and the Second Mexican Empire. He was promoted to major on August 20, 1863 and was given command of the "Ramírez" Squadron and that of lieutenant colonel in August 1864, colonel on November 25 and General brigadier on March 1, 1865 and given command of the 3rd Western Brigade.

== Service in the North ==
At the end of the year, General Corona ordered him to start operating in the north of Sinaloa and the south of the state, he liberated El Fuerte from the imperialist forces and began an offensive into Sonora. On January 7, 1866, he attacked and captured the Plaza of Álamos from a brusque cavalry charge that shattered the resistance of the Empire's defenders. He distinguished himself as a brave, active and inhuman leader who went to the state of Sonora to inject energy into the Republican cause at a time when other Republican leaders were beginning to lose morale and brought a system of ruthless and violent war that was unknown before and didn't show any mercy to his enemies, executing them on the spot or making them victims of strong exactions expressing that if they had caught him they would not forgive him, and therefore he should not give them quarter. The cavalry charges of the chinacos armed with machetes made them popularly known as "los macheteros" as they scored decisive victories, which made them a feared force. After having recovered Álamos, he acquired elements and resources of the Río Mayo and the Rosario region under the command of Colonels Alcántara and Correa who won the battles of Bayájorit and Movas but fell back on the Rio Fuerte when a Native American revolt broke out and Martínez subdued them, returning to Álamos soon after.

He returned to Sinaloa most of his brigade under the command of Corona, informing the National Guard that hos forces were organized and in April, he advanced on the interior of the State. On this date he was promoted to General de brigada and made conjunction with Governor Ignacio Pesqueira, capturing Hermosillo on May 4 in the morning but in the afternoon of the same day, he was defeated by the imperialists. Having to evacuate it, he rebuilt his forces, marched on Ures but was defeated again and had to withdraw in the direction of Tecoripa and Cumuripa. His battalions reorganized, and he headed for Hermosillo again, entering the city on August 13. The advance of two Imperialist columns forced him on the 21st to head for Rayón and other towns in the north. Oon September 4, he led the Battle of Guadalupe against the Imperialist troops gathered in the town of Guadalupe de Ures and completely defeated them, managing to also kill General Edvard Emile Langberg. He immediately proceeded to Ures, which was captured on the 6th, and was instructed to proceed to Guaymas. While en route, he received news of the evacuation of the port by the French and went ahead with an escort, arriving in the early hours of the 15th. He ordered the persecution of the chiefs and officers who collaborated with the French and had fled to the Baja California Territory seeking asylum. Some were apprehended in front of Santa Rosalía and others in Mulegé and had them executed by firing squad on the 25th.

== Recognition and exile ==
Appointed chief of the I Division of the Western Army Corps, he dispatched Colonel Dávalos by sea with elements that served as his base and in November, he went to join General Corona's forces. In his record of service, he was credited with more than 50 war actions during the Reform War and the Second French Intervention. Regarding his performance in the State, Governor Pesqueira expressed the following in a circular dated October 1, 1866 :

Sonora has had as auxiliaries the Governor of Sinaloa and Division General Ramón Corona, who, upon sending me some reinforcements of troops, also sent me General Ángel Martínez and other worthy chiefs, who, longing to fight in defense of the national cause, do not know make distinction of place; but they do know how to distinguish themselves by their bravery, their serenity in danger and by the activity of the long-suffering and persevering soldier. Sonora recognizes herself indebted for this very distinguished service, which she will hasten to reward in the same way, paying them a sincere tribute of gratitude.

Upon his arrival in Mazatlan, he was appointed Chief of the Arms of Sinaloa and held that post until 1868. He was then a candidate for the government of that State and dissatisfied with the resolution of the Local Legislature, ignored the powers of the same at the head of the troops that obeyed him, and he exercised the Executive Power for a few days but was defeated in Villa Unión by General Corona. Seeing that his cause was lost, he seized thirty thousand pesos from the Mazatlán maritime customs office, left half in the hands of a trusted friend of his and embarked for San Francisco, California. There, he paid for the education that he lacked, as he barely knew how to sign. At the outbreak of the Franco-Prussian War in 1870, out of hatred for the French, went to join the Prussian Army and in January 1871, entered the city of Paris. He returned to Mexico the following year, and President Benito Juárez prosecuted him for the funds he had taken in Mazatlán. Upon Juárez's death, President Lerdo gave him amnesty, and he was able to return to Sinaloa. He collected deposits that were given to him religiously and moved to Colima where he bought the "Paso de Río" hacienda and since then he has been linked to the local environment of that city.

== Later career ==
In 1873, he was elected federal deputy for one of the Colima districts and in 1875, senator for the aforementioned State. In 1876, he rejoined the Mexican Army, defended the government of Sebastián Lerdo de Tejada against the Plan of Tuxtepec, holding the government of San Luis Potosí for a short time. He then operated in the states of Jalisco and Michoacán, recognizing José María Iglesias as interim president of the Republic and escorted him to the port of Manzanillo. He then embarked to foreign countries but in 1878, disappointed with the Lerdista administration, requested his return to Mexico and returned to settle in Colima. He was again a senator for the state from 1880 to 1904, with brief interruptions in which he held military commissions. In 1885, he was at Sonora, taking charge of the leadership of the 1st Military Zone, participating in the Yaqui Wars until they were subjected to impotence and most of them surrendered to the Government. He then apprehended and ordered the execution of Cajemé and managed to temporarily restore order.

In January 1889, he was promoted to the 5th Military Zone which had its headquarters in Matamoros and on the following June 18, he obtained a patent for retirement from the Army. He died in Colima on May 22, 1904.
