= Bataconcica =

Bataconcica (Museo Chopocuni)
- Interactive map of Bataconcica (Museo Chopocuni)
- Coordinates: 27°33′33″N 110°07′46″W
- Country: Mexico
- State: Sonora
- Municipality: Bácum
- Established: 1930s

Area
  - Total: 0.3 km^{2} (0.12 sq mi)
- Elevation: 24 m (79 ft)

Population (2020)
  - Total: 573
- Time zone: UTC-7 (MT (UTC−7))
  - Summer (DST): not observed
- Postal code: 85271
- Area code: 644
- INEGI: 260120007

Bataconcica (from the Yaqui Ba'atakomsika ''Where the water came down'), also known as Museo Chopocuni, is a locality in Bácum Municipality located in the southern part of the Mexican state of Sonora in the Yaqui Valley area. The locality is the sixth most populous in the municipality, as according to the 2020 Census by the Instituto Nacional de Estadística y Geografía (INEGI), Bataconcica has a total of 573 inhabitants. A large number of Yaqui indigenous people reside in Bataconcica.

== Geography ==
Bataconcica is located at coordinates 27°33'33" north latitude and 110°07'46" west longitude of the Prime Meridian, at an average elevation of 24 meters above sea level, situated on the flat areas of the Yaqui Valley. Its inhabited area covers an area of 0.3 square kilometers.

== Demographics ==
=== Educational institutions ===
In 2005, there were three registered educational centers in the locality:

- The indigenous kindergarten "Bataconcica," publicly managed by the federal government;
- The indigenous early education school "Jiak Sewa," federally public;
- The indigenous primary school "Padre de las Casas," federally public.

=== Population ===
Population evolution since the 1940 census:

| Year | 1940 | 1950 | 1960 | 1970 | 1980 | 1990 | 1995 | 2000 | 2005 | 2010 | 2020 |
| Population | 65 | 3 | 257 | 240 | 371 | 400 | 518 | 526 | 534 | 561 | 573 |
Source: INEGI

== Government ==
Bataconcica (Museo Chopocuni) is one of the 194 localities that make up the Municipality of Bácum, with its government seat located in the municipal seat, in the town of Bácum.
