= General (Mexico) =

Military rank

The military rank of General in Mexico is divided into four categories:

- General Brigadier: equivalent to the Brigadier and between "Coronel" (Colonel) and "General de Brigada" (Brigade General).
- General de Brigada: Brigade General.
- General de Division: Divisional General.
- General Secretario de la Defensa Nacional: The highest military rank in the Mexican army - the "Secretary of Defense". The only person ranking higher is the President of Mexico.

== See also ==
- Army ranks and insignia of Mexico
- Naval ranks and insignia of Mexico
- Mexican Air Force § Ranks
- Mexican Army § Ranks
