= Vícam =

- Location in Mexico
- Coordinates: 27°38′32″N 110°17′23″W
- Country: Mexico
- State: Sonora
- Municipality: Guaymas
- Elevation: 10 m (33 ft)

Population (2005)
  - Total: 8,578
- Time zone: UTC–07:00 (Zona Pacífico)
- Postal code: 85510
- Area code: 643

Vícam is a town in the Mexican state of Sonora located in the municipal of Guaymas. It is one of the main settlements of the Yaqui people. Historically, the Yaqui also ranged through what is now the American Southwest, and there is a federally recognized tribe in the United States state of Arizona.

== History ==
Vícam is one of the eight mission villages in which the Yaqui were settled in the early seventeenth century by Spanish Jesuit missionaries, along with Pótam, Tórim, Bácum, Cócorit, Huiribis, Benem, and Rahum. Today it is the second largest settlement in the municipality of Guaymas, and one of the main Yaqui settlements. Vícam hosted the Meeting of the Indigenous People of the Americas from October 11–14, 2007.

== Description and demographics ==
Vícam is located in the south end of the municipio and at an altitude of 10 meters above sea level. Federal Highway 15 connects it to the north with Guaymas and Hermosillo, and to the south with Ciudad Obregón and Navojoa.

According to the Census of Population and Housing conducted in 2005 by the National Institute of Statistics and Geography, the total population of Vícam is 8,578, 4,207 of whom are men and 4,371 of whom are women.
