= Ramón Corral =

6th Vice President Of Mexico from 1904 to 1911

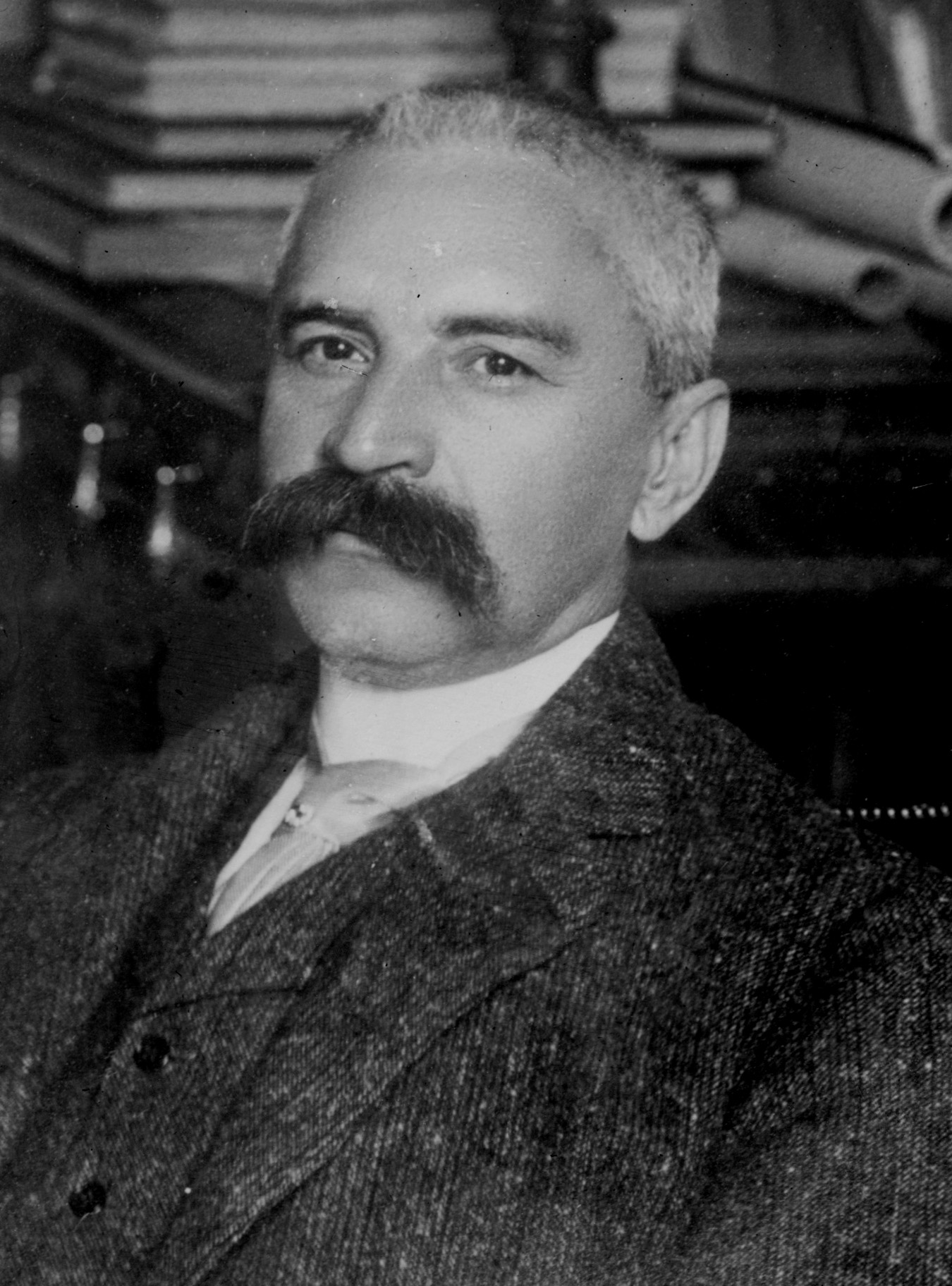
- Corral, c. 1904

6th Vice President of Mexico
- In office 1 December 1904 – 23 May 1911
- President: Porfirio Díaz
- Preceded by: Valentín Gómez Farías (position reestablished) (Note: Gómez Farías was serving as both President and Vice President in 1847 when he was ousted by Antonio López de Santa Anna. The office remained vacant for the next decade, until the adoption of the Constitution of 1857, which abolished the position of Vice President. Subsequent administrations continued to lack a vice presidential position, until the regime of President Porfirio Díaz during the Porfiriato. By 1904, Díaz was over 70 years old and fears mounted of political instability should he die in office or be unable to continue serving as president. In response, he reestablished the office of vice president with Corral in the role.)
- Succeeded by: José María Pino Suárez

Secretary of the Interior
- In office 16 January 1903 – 23 May 1911
- President: Porfirio Díaz
- Preceded by: Manuel González Cossio
- Succeeded by: Emilio Vázquez Gómez

Governor of the Federal District
- In office 8 December 1900 – 2 January 1903
- Preceded by: Guillermo Landa y Escandón
- Succeeded by: Guillermo Landa y Escandón

Personal details
- Born: Ramón Corral Verdugo; 10 January 1854 Álamos, Sonora, Mexico
- Died: 10 November 1912 (aged 58) Paris, France
- Resting place: Père Lachaise Cemetery
- Occupation: Politician

Ramón Corral Verdugo (January 10, 1854 – November 10, 1912) was a Mexican politician who served as the Vice President of Mexico under President Porfirio Díaz from 1904 when it was reestablished until their resignations in May 1911, due to mounting pressure from Liberal forces during the Mexican Revolution. He previously served as Governor of the Federal District and Secretary of the Interior.

== Early life ==
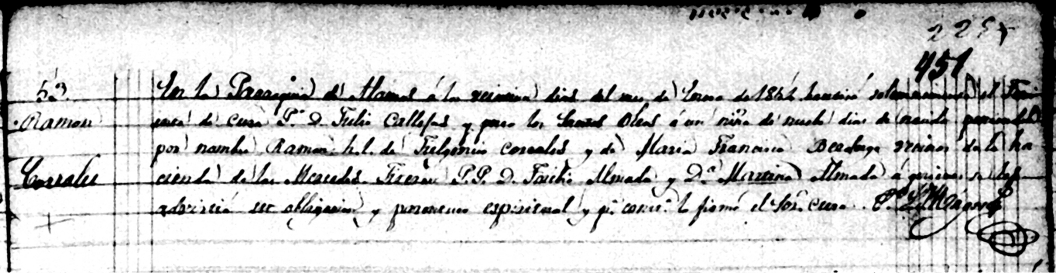
Image of Ramon Corral's baptism registration from 21 January 1854

Corral was born Ramón Corral Verdugo on Hacienda Las Mercedes (where his father worked as an administrator), near the city of Álamos, Sonora, on 10 January 1854 to Fulgencio Fabián Corral Rochín (January, 1834–1868) and María Francisca Almada y Verdugo (1836-). He was christened on 21 January 1854 at the Purísima Concepción Roman Catholic Church in Mexico. His recorded paternal baptismal surname was Corrales, however the surname Corral is commonly used.

Ramón Corral first gained public attention in 1872, when General Don Ignacio L. Pesqueira, Governor of the State of Sonora, an undefeated general who had provided many services to his state, created public outrage when he introduced state constitutional reforms. To avoid compliance with a law, Pesqueira introduced, among other reforms, a ban on re-election governor. The young Corral vigorously fought against the Pesqueira administration through the press, founding the newspapers El Fantasma ("The Phantom"), and La Voz de Álamos ("The Voice of Álamos"). His writings in the papers exhibited civil valor, love for democracy, and power as a political adversary of the Pesqueira administration. In the years that followed, Corral increasingly became involved in politics.

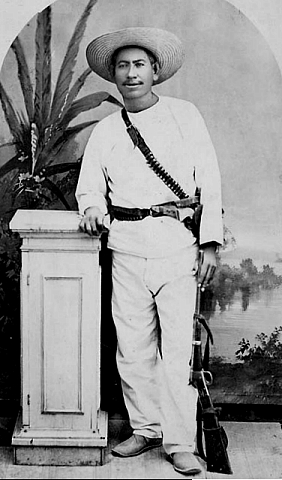
Yaqui leader José Maria Bonifacio Leiva Perez, Cajemé, who Corral interviewed following his capture

While General Secretary of the Government of Sonora, Corral was involved with the capture of the indigenous Yaqui military leader José Maria Leiva, known as Cajemé. In La Constitución (Periódico oficial del gobierno del estado libre y soberano de Sonora), beginning with the issue of April 22, 1887, and ending July 8, 1887, Corral published biographical notes about Cajemé, which were recorded only a few days earlier during personal talks with the captured Yaqui. Cajemé was being held at the time in the house of the military chief of the area, Angel Martínez, who had personally arrested him while Cajemé was hiding in San Jose de Guaymas.

Corral married Amparo V. Escalante on February 25, 1888. He had an affair with a woman named Guadalupe Mollinedo in 1905, who gave birth to his only daughter, Anita Corral. His wife was the daughter of Vicente Escalante, a well-known Mexican statesman of the time. The religious element of the twofold marriage ceremony was performed by Father Ortega of Hermosillo, with a civil ceremony performed by Civil Judge Bonito Méndez, of the Hermosillo District.

== Political career ==
Corral was one of the científicos who advised Mexican President Porfirio Díaz. Corral served as Secretary of State from 1891 to 1895. He became Governor of the Federal District of Mexico in 1900 and was sworn in as Minister of the Interior in the cabinet of Díaz in 1903. He became vice-president in 1904 and was re-elected in 1910.

=== Offices held ===
- Local Deputy of Sonora: 1879-1881, 1883–1885, 1885–1887.
- Federal Deputy of Sonora: 1881-1883.
- General Secretary of the Government of Sonora: 1879-1880, 1883-1887.
- Vice-Governor of Sonora: 1887-1891.
- Secretary of State: 1891-1895.
- Governor of Sonora 1895-1899.
- Governor of the Federal District: 1900-1903.
- Secretary of the Interior and Vice-President of the Republic: 1903-1904, 1904–1911, 1910–1911.

== Later life ==
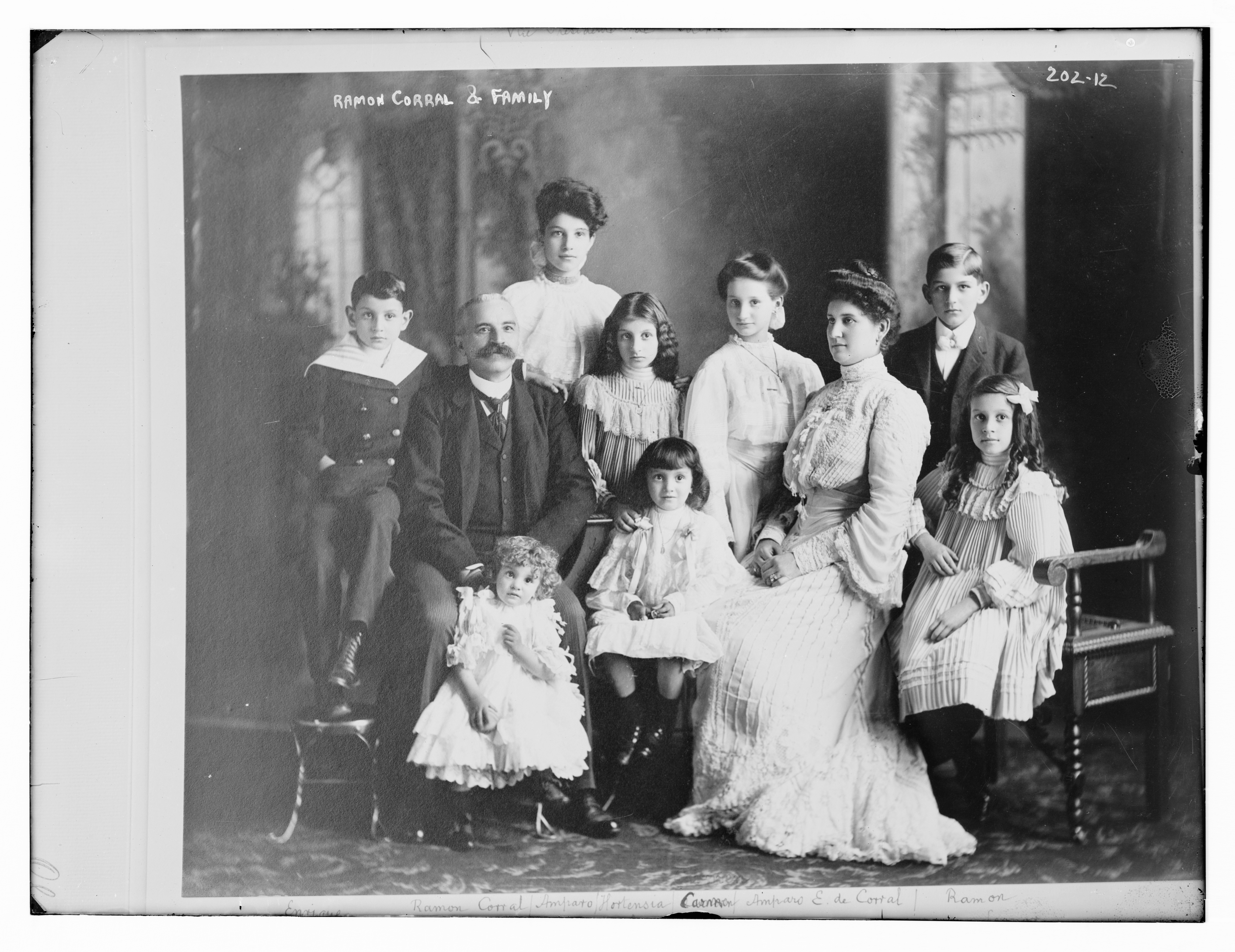
Ramón Corral and his family.

Corral traveled with his family to Paris for medical care, where he was diagnosed with cancer. After his operation, the cancer was found to be incurable. In light of his own deteriorating health and the increasing revolutionary opposition to the Díaz government, Corral submitted his resignation, dated May 10, 1911, to Francisco León de la Barra, Díaz's foreign secretary, which de la Barra held until Díaz submitted his own "Renuncia" on May 25, 1911. He in fact stepped down two days before Díaz.

=== Letter of Resignation ===
Corral's letter of resignation gave no doubt that he had foreknowledge of Díaz's intention to resign, and that the course of events would lead to a new government for Mexico:

On the two occasions that the national convention advanced my candidacy as Vice-President of the republic, to figure in the elections with Gen. Diaz as President, I stated that I was prepared to occupy any office in which compatriots considered that I would be of use, and that if the public vote conferred upon me a position so far above my merits, then my intention would be to second in all respects Gen. Diaz's policy, in order to co-operate with him, as far as it lay in my power, toward the aggrandizement of the nation, which had developed so notably under his administration.

Those who concern themselves with public affairs and have observed their progress during the last few years will be able to say whether I have complied with my intention.

For my part, I can say that I have never endeavored to bring about the least obstacle either in the President's policy or his manner of carrying it out even at the cost of sacrificing my convictions, both because this was the basis of my programme and because this corresponded to my position and my loyalty, as well as that I did not seek any prestige in the office of Vice-President, so useful in the United States and so discredited in Latin countries.

In the events which have shaken the country during these latter months, the President has been brought to consider that it is patriotic to resign from the high office that the almost unanimous vote of Mexicans had conferred upon him in the last election, and that it is advisable at the same time, in the interest of the country, that the Vice-President do likewise, so that new men and new energies should continue forwarding the prosperity of the nation.

Following my program of seconding Gen. Diaz's policy, I join my resignation with his and in the present note I retire from the office of Vice-President of the republic, begging the chamber to accept the same at the same time as that of the President.

I beg of you gentlemen to inform yourselves of the above, which I submit with the protests of my highest consideration.

Liberty and Constitution, Paris, May 4, 1911.

[Signed] "RAMON CORRAL."

=== Death ===
Corral died of cancer in Paris on 10 November 1912, surrounded by family members.

== Selected works ==
- Breve Manifestación que la Diputación Permanente del Congreso del Estado, Hace al Pueblo. Ures, Sonora, México: Imprenta del Gobierno. 1878
- El General Ignacio Pesqueira: Reseña Histórica del Estado de Sonora. Hermosillo, Sonora, Mexico: Imprenta del Estado. 1900 [1886]. A biography of Ignacio Pesqueira, governor of Sonora for 20 years (1856–1876).
- Informe leido por el C. Ramón Corral vice gobernador constitucional de Sonora ante la legislatura del mismo estado. Hermosillo, Sonora, México: Gobierno del Estado. 1889.
- La Mayoría del Congreso del Estado, al Pueblo Sonorense. Hermosillo, Sonora, Mexico: Imprenta de Roberto Bernal. 1878
- La cuestion de la harina. Coleccion de articulos y documentos publicados en "El Telégrafo". México: Tip. de V. Villada. 1881.
- Memoria de la administración pública del Estado de Sonora, presentada a la Legislatura del mismo por el Gobernador Ramón Corral. 2 vols. Guaymas, Sonora, México: Imprenta de E. Gaxiola. 1891
- Memoria de la Secretaría de Gobernación : Que comprende de lo. de diciembre de 1904 a 30 de junio de 1906. México: Imprenta del Gobierno Federal. 1909
- Obras históricas. Reseña histórica del Estado de Sonora, 1856-1877. Hermosillo, Sonora, México: Imprenta del Estado. 1900. A biography of José María Leiva (Cajemé), the Yaqui leader whom Corral interviewed shortly before Cajemé was executed.
