= Cócorit =

Village in Sonora, Mexico

Coordinates: 27°35′00″N 109°58′00″W

Cócorit is a town located in the municipality of Cajeme in the southern part of the Mexican state of Sonora. The name of the town is derived from the Yaqui (Yoem noki, or Hiak noki) word for a chili pepper, ko'oko'i. Cócorit and the municipality of Cajeme are within the Yaqui River Valley. The comisario municipal ("municipal commissioner") of Cajeme is Ing. Arturo Soto Valenzuela. Cócorit reported a 2005 census population of 7,953 inhabitants, and is the fifth-largest town in the municipality of Cajeme (after Ciudad Obregón, Esperanza, Pueblo Yaqui, and Tobarito).

== History ==
=== Yaqui resistance ===
The town was founded in 1617 by the Spanish Jesuit missionaries Andrés Pérez de Ribas and Tomás Basilio as Espíritu Santu Cócorit. The Spanish inhabitants were eventually forced to leave by the Yaqui native population of the area. In 1835 the town was reestablished, this time in an independent Mexico; the town was a dependency of the municipio of Buenavista. In 1867, the governor of Sonora (Pesqueira) organized two successful military expeditions to control the Yaquis in Cócorit, and in neighboring Guaymas. In 1875, Cajemé, a prominent Yaqui leader, attacked Cócorit, setting the town on fire. Under the protection of the Mexican army, Cócorit was repopulated in 1885 with inhabitants from the neighboring towns of El Quiriego and Baroyeca. In 1886, the Yaquis continued to strengthen their positions, but the state and federal governments confiscated more than 20,000 head of livestock that belonged to the Yaquis, weakening their position. In 1887 Cajemé was captured. After an interview with Ramón Corral, Cajemé was taken in the custody of a Mexican army detachment led by Lieutenant Clemente Patiño to El Médano on the steamboat "Demócrata." He paraded through some of the Yaqui towns, and was then shot by the detachment on the pretense that he was trying to escape.

=== American and European immigration ===
In the early 20th century, the Conant family received a concession from the Mexican government to develop agriculture in the Valley. American immigrants arrived and built a fire station and a water tower. The area was flooded after two years, and the population sought refuge in Providencia. In 1917, after the first World War, German and Yugoslav families sought refuge in the Valley. A year later, one of the immigrants, Herman Bruss, introduced the first internal combustion tractor, further supporting agriculture.

In 1927 Cócorit became its own short-lived municipio. In 1928 when the growing neighboring town of Cajeme changed its name to "Ciudad Obregón", it became the cabecera (capital) of the municipio.

== Tourism ==
The main attraction of the town is La Casona Cócorit ("Cócorit Mansion"), built in the (19th century) in the style of colonial architecture. The mansion is currently an art museum with permanent exhibits of paintings and handicrafts. Also, old adobe houses in the town are still preserved, and are an attraction. One of the main festivities is the Feria de San Juan Cócorit ("San Juan Cócorit Fair") that takes place every summer on June 24. The "Fundación Cócorit" ("The Cócorit Foundation") also organizes its own fair with artistic presentations.
