= Military ranks of Mexico =

The military ranks of Mexico are the military insignia used by the Mexican Armed Forces. Mexico shares a rank structure similar to that of Spain.

== Ranks ==
=== Commissioned officer ranks ===
The rank insignia of commissioned officers.

Rank group	General / flag officers				Senior officers			Junior officers
Mexican Army
Mexican Army	Secretario de la defensa nacional	General de división	General de brigada	General brigadier	Coronel	Teniente coronel	Mayor	Capitan primero	Capitán segundo	Teniente	Subteniente
Mexican Navy
Mexican Navy	Secretario de Marina	Almirante	Vicealmirante	Contraalmirante	Capitán de navío	Capitán de fragata	Capitán de corbeta	Teniente de navio	Teniente de fragata	Teniente de corbeta	Guardiamarina
Mexican Air Force
Mexican Air Force		General de división	General de ala	General de grupo	Coronel	Teniente coronel	Mayor	Capitan primero	Capitán segundo	Teniente	Subteniente
Mexican National Guard
Mexican National Guard		Comisario General	Comisario Jefe	Comisario	Inspector General	Inspector Jefe	Inspector	Subinspector Primero	Subinspector Segundo	Oficial	Suboficial

=== Student officer ranks ===
Rank group	Student officer
Mexican Army
Mexican Army	Sargento 1º de cadetes	Sargento 2º de cadetes	Cabo de cadetes
Mexican Navy
Mexican Navy	Sargento 1º de cadetes	Sargento 2º de cadetes	Cabo de cadetes
Mexican Air Force
Mexican Air Force	Sargento 1º de cadetes	Sargento 2º de cadetes	Cabo de cadetes

=== Other ranks ===
The rank insignia of non-commissioned officers and enlisted personnel.

Rank group	Senior NCOs		Junior NCOs	Enlisted
Mexican Army
Mexican Army	Sargento primero	Sargento segundo	Cabo	Soldado
Mexican Navy
Mexican Navy	Segundo maestre	Tercer maestre	Cabo	Marinero
Mexican Air Force
Mexican Air Force	Sargento primero	Sargento segundo	Cabo	Soldado
Mexican National Guard
Mexican National Guard	Agente Mayor	Agente	Subagente	Guardia Nacional

== Branch colors ==
Rank badges have a band of colour indicating branch:

Colour	Branch/service
Gold	General officers
Light brown	General staff; Presidential Guards Corps, Presidential High Command
Purple	Army aviation (includes the Air Force); Parachutist Fusiliers
Red	Infantry
Crimson red	Artillery
Red-brown	Quartermaster Command (Spanish: Materiales de Guerra)
Light orange-brown	Transportation
Green	Judicial Corps (Spanish: Justicia); military police
cobalt blue	Engineers; signals and communications (Spanish: transmisiones)
Light blue	Cavalry, Veterinarians
Sky Blue	Cartography
Gray	Military bands and drummers and buglers
Light gray	armored
Brownish gray	Service corps (Spanish: administracion e intendencia)
Yellow	Medical

== Historical ranks ==
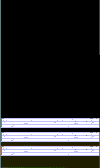
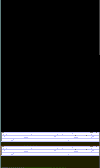
Rank group	Senior NCOs		Junior NCOs	Enlisted
Mexican Army (c. 1996)
Mexican Army (c. 1996)	Sargento primero	Sargento segundo	Cabo	Soldado de Primera	Soldado
Mexican Navy (c. 1996)
Mexican Navy (c. 1996)	Segundo maestre	Tercer maestre	Cabo		Marinero
