= Bácum =

Village in Sonora, Mexico

Bácum is a small city and the county seat of Bácum Municipality, located in the south of the Mexican state of Sonora at 27°32′N 110°05′W.

It is one of eight mission villages founded in the early seventeenth century by colonial Spanish Jesuit missionaries for the Indian Reductions of the Yaqui people. The Yaqui developed their own syncretic form of the religion.

== History ==
The town of Bácum is one of the eight historical Spanish mission towns of the Yaqui Indians, founded in 1617 by the Jesuit missionaries Andrés Pérez de Ribas and Tomás Basilio. They called it Santa Rosa de Bácum.

In 1930 the town was incorporated into the municipality of Cajeme, and it was granted autonomy within the new Bácum Municipality in 1931. In 1949 the Yaqui River overflowed its banks, causing severe damage to agriculture and livestock raising. The river is now controlled by the Álvaro Obregón Dam upriver.

== Geography ==
Bácum Municipality is bounded by the Municipalities of Cajeme in the east and Guaymas in the west — and the Gulf of California in the south.

Area and population

The area of the municipality is 1,409.7 km^{2} (544.3 mi^{2}); and the population was 21,322 in 2005. Of these, 3,600 resided in the town of Bácum. The town is situated at an elevation of 50 meters (160 ft) above sea level.

== Economy ==
The municipality's main economic activity is intensive agriculture, with more than 300 square kilometers under irrigation by canal. The main crops are wheat, corn, soybeans, barley, cotton, and garden vegetables, as well as seasonal crops such as alfalfa and some fruits.

The municipality's coastline south of the town is 12 kilometres (7.5 mi) long. Some fishing is practiced. Industries are small, and consist chiefly of packing houses for vegetables and liquid fertilizer production.

== See also ==
- Jesuit Reductions
- Spanish missions in the Sonoran Desert
- Municipalities of Sonora

== Sources ==
- Instituto Nacional de Estadistica, Geografia, e Informática
- Enciclopedia de los Municipios de Mexico
