= Cajeme =

Municipality in Sonora, Mexico

Coordinates: 27°29′47.4″N 109°55′57.1″W

- Municipality
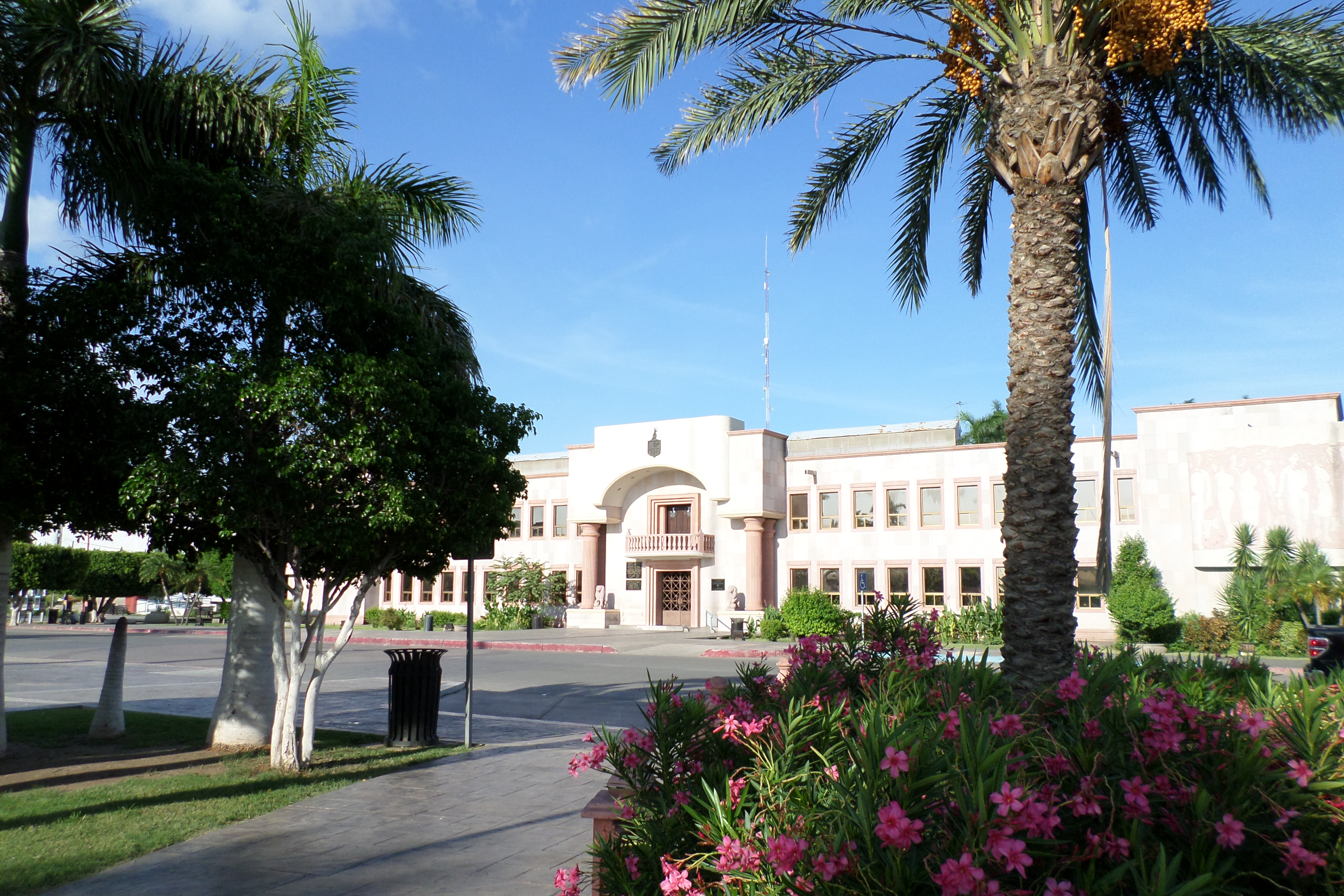
- Municipal Palace of Cajeme

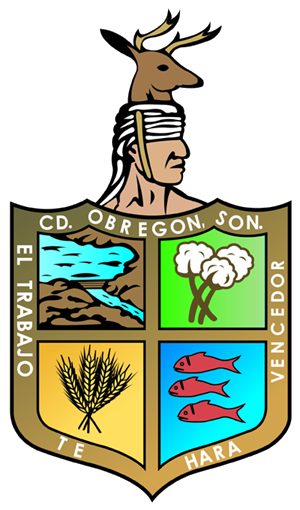
- Coat of arms

- Location of the municipality in Sonora
- Country: Mexico
- State: Sonora
- Seat: Ciudad Obregón

Population (2020)
  - Total: 436,484
- Time zone: UTC–07:00 (Zona Pacífico)
- Area code: +52 644
- Website: cajeme.gob.mx

Cajeme is one of the 72 municipalities of the northwestern Mexican state of Sonora. It is named after Cajemé, a Yaqui leader. The municipality has an area of 3,312.05 km^{2} (1,278.79 sq mi) and with a population of 436,484 inhabitants as of 2020. The municipal seat is at Ciudad Obregón.

== History ==
Yaqui tribes had settled in the region by around 1100 CE. In 1533 CE, the Yaqui first encountered a Spanish expeditionary force sent out by the governor of Nueva Galicia, Nuño de Guzmán. The expedition was led by Diego de Guzmán, the governor's nephew. A popular account of the confrontation, though not entirely substantiated, describes a Yaqui war party confronting the conquistadors after they had crossed the Yaqui river. A warrior among them, identified as Aniabailutec, approached Guzmán and drew a line in the sand before them with his bow, warning that any man who crossed it would be killed. He then knelt and kissed the earth before the line. the ensuing confrontation escalated into a battle in which the Yaqui fiercely fought the Spanish.

In the 17th century, Jesuit missionaries visited the area to evangelize the Yaqui natives in 1617. In 1619, one of the missionaries, Martín Burgencio, founded the Mission San Francisco Buenavista as a visita (secondary mission without a resident priest) of Mission San Francisco Xavier de Cumuripa.

In 1715, El Realito, a minor settlement on the banks of the Yaqui river, was founded. In the 19th century, agriculture would develop in the villas of Cumuripa, Buenavista and Cócorit.

Buenavista was the site of the military outpost of San Carlos de Buenavista during the Spanish colonial period. From 1820, it served as the capital of the Villa de Salvación. During the second half of the 19th century, it was incorporated into the Guaymas district and was also recognized as one of the Yaqui pueblos.

The first inhabitants of what would become Ciudad Obregon settled in the Plano Oriente neighborhood following the introduction of irrigation systems by the Richardson Construction Company, which began operating in 1904. The Sudpacífico Railway established a station there, dubbed Cajeme. At the time, Cajeme was part of the municipality of Cócorit. On November 29, 1927, it became the municipal seat. On July 28, 1928, the settlement was renamed Ciudad Obregón and was designated the capital of the municipality of Cajeme.

During the early independence period, Cócorit was subordinate the district of Buenavista. Under a 1828 law concerning indigenous governments, it was designated as the seat of one of their administrative jurisdictions. On December 26, 1930, Cócorit was incorporated into the municipality of Cajeme.

== Important towns ==
- Ciudad Obregón
- Cócorit
- Esperanza
- Marte R. Gómez (Tobarito)
- Providencia
- Pueblo Yaqui

== See also ==
- Municipalities of Sonora
- Cajemé- Yaqui Leader, born 1837, died 1887.
