= Anselmo Valencia Tori Amphitheater =

Amphitheater concert facility in Tucson, Arizona

Coordinates: 32°07′47″N 111°05′03″W

- AVA Amphitheater
- Interactive map of Anselmo Valencia Tori Amphitheater
- Address: 5655 West Valencia Road, S Ignacio M Baumea Tucson, Arizona
- Owner: Casino del Sol
- Seating type: reserved and lawn
- Capacity: approximately 5,000
- Type: Amphitheatre

Construction
- Opened: October 14, 2001

Website
- www.avaconcerts.com

Anselmo Valencia Tori Amphitheater (commonly AVA Amphitheater) is the first amphitheater concert facility, in Tucson, Arizona, with a capacity of about 4,500-5,000. It officially opened on October 14, 2001, as part of the new Casino Del Sol, located on, and belonging to, the Arizona Pascua Yaqui Tribe. It was renovated in 2018.

It is named after Anselmo Valencia Tori, a World War II veteran and former chairman of the Pascua Yaqui Association.

== Concerts ==
List of Concerts
- Alan Jackson & The Strayhorns – October 14, 2001, May 15 and September 11, 2008 and May 15, 2014
- Styx – October 26, 2001, with Survivor and May 4, 2012, with Ted Nugent and REO Speedwagon
- Luis Miguel – April 6, 2002, September 30, 2005, September 17, 2008, June 3, 2011 and September 19, 2013
- P!nk – May 4, 2002, with Candy Ass
- Julio Iglesias – May 9, 2002 and July 13, 2005
- Weezer – May 11, 2002, with AM Radio
- Karl Denson's Tiny Universe – May 18, 2002, with David Sanborn and Boney James
- Scorpions – June 4, 2002, with Deep Purple and Dio, September 18, 2007, with 3, August 5, 2008, with Sammy Hagar & The Waboritas and June 17, 2012, with Tesla
- Barry Manilow – June 22, 2002
- Little Richard – July 4, 2002
- Martina McBride – July 7, 2002, with The Clark Family Experience, June 16, 2006, with The Warren Brothers and June 18, 2013
- The Stylistics – July 18, 2002, with The Chi-Lites
- Sheryl Crow – July 23, 2002, with Train and O.A.R. and August 19, 2008, with James Blunt and Toots and the Maytals
- Trisha Yearwood – July 27, 2002
- Natalie Cole – August 17, 2002
- The Metal Edge Rock Festival – September 13, 2002
- Journey – September 20, 2002, June 30, 2005, July 19, 2008, with Cheap Trick and Heart and August 2, 2009
- Toby Keith – September 29, 2002, with The Rascal Flatts and November 21, 2004
- Tony Bennett – October 6, 2002, October 2, 2007, June 5, 2010 and May 19, 2013
- Ana Gabriel – October 11, 2002, October 14, 2006 and October 23, 2010
- Bob Dylan – October 23, 2002, July 24, 2007 and July 19, 2011, with Leon Russell
- Sammy Hagar & The Waboritas – April 30, 2003, June 4, 2011, with Hurtsmile and July 26, 2013
- Gin Blossoms – May 22, 2003
- Crosby, Stills & Nash – June 4, 2003, June 23, 2008 and September 5, 2012
- Manzarek–Krieger – July 26, 2003
- Alice Cooper – July 29, 2003, September 9, 2008, with Warrant, October 2, 2010, with Rob Zombie and The Murderdolls and June 7, 2013, with Marilyn Manson
- Boz Scaggs – August 2, 2003 and March 9, 2012
- Tori Amos – August 5, 2003, with Ben Folds and The Suburbs
- The Go-Go's – August 19, 2003 and July 11, 2013, with The B-52's
- The Gipsy Kings – August 31, 2003, July 13, 2004 and August 17, 2005
- The Goo Goo Dolls – September 4, 2003 and June 7, 2010, with Vedera
- 3 Doors Down – September 9, 2003, with Our Lady Peace and Seether and October 23, 2011, with Theory of a Deadman and Pop Evil
- The Allman Brothers Band – September 17, 2003, with Karl Denson's Tiny Universe
- Trick Pony – October 5, 2003, with Emerson Drive
- Godsmack – October 12, 2003, with Adema, November 14, 2006, with Breaking Benjamin and Hourcast and October 14, 2011
- Josh Groban – May 9, 2004
- Alejandro Sanz – May 16, 2004
- A Perfect Circle – June 8, 2004, with The Burning Brides
- The Motels featuring Martha Davis – July 4, 2004, with John Waite
- Café Tacuba – July 20, 2004 and July 6, 2005, with Kinky
- KC and the Sunshine Band – August 12, 2004
- Berlin – August 13, 2004, with The Psychedelic Furs
- Wynonna Judd – September 3, 2004
- Kid Rock & Twisted Brown Trucker – October 7, 2004, September 23, 2008, with Rehab and July 3, 2014
- Buddy Guy – October 16, 2004, with Indigenous and Jonny Lang
- Melissa Etheridge – October 30, 2004
- Megadeth – October 31, 2004
- Van Halen – November 18–19, 2004
- Alejandro Fernández – November 23, 2004, September 26, 2008, September 10, 2011 and September 14, 2012
- Chris Isaak – December 4, 2004 and July 12, 2011
- Queensrÿche – February 14, 2005
- Johnny Rivers – April 15, 2005
- Los Lonely Boys – May 8, 2005, with Calexico and Ozomatli, August 12, 2006, with Kinky, August 19, 2007, with Toots and the Maytals, July 27, 2008, with Los Lobos and August 4, 2013, with Los Lobos and Alejandro Escovedo
- Baby Bash – May 11, 2005
- Paulina Rubio – May 15, 2005 and September 16, 2006
- Ludacris – May 19, 2005, with Akon
- Seal – May 21, 2005, with Chris Pierce and August 3, 2012, with Macy Gray
- George Thorogood & The Destroyers – June 9, 2005, with Dickey Betts & Great Southern, September 21, 2006, with Buddy Guy and The Elvin Bishop Group, August 6, 2008, with Buddy Guy and October 7, 2012, with Molly Hatchet
- Alejandra Guzmán – June 10, 2005
- Reba McEntire – June 16, 2005, with Brad Paisley & The Drama Kings and Terri Clark
- Tom Jones – June 27, 2005, with The Tower of Power
- War – July 3, 2005, July 13, 2007, September 6–7, 2008, July 2, 2011 and September 28, 2012, with The Average White Band
- Jaguares – July 16, 2005
- The Gigantour – July 29, 2005
- 311 – August 2, 2005, with Unwritten Law
- Lonestar – August 11, 2005
- Velvet Revolver – August 21, 2005, with Chevelle
- Blues Traveler – August 25, 2005
- Molotov – September 24, 2005
- ZZ Top – October 1 and November 1, 2005, May 7, 2008, December 9, 2012 and August 17, 2014, with Jeff Beck
- Lee Ann Womack – October 2, 2005
- Santana – October 11, 2005, with the Salvador Santana Band and Robert Randolph and the Family Band and September 20, 2011, with Michael Franti & Spearhead
- Widespread Panic – October 26, 2005, with deSoL
- Rob Thomas – November 4, 2005, with Antigone Rising
- B.B. King – November 6, 2005, with Bob Corritore
- Staind – November 17, 2005, with P.O.D., Taproot and Flyleaf
- Marco Antonio Solís – November 18, 2005, with Ana Gabriel, September 12, 2008, September 29, 2012 and September 13, 2014
- Tears for Fears – November 26, 2005, with Dirty Vegas
- Brooks & Dunn – February 26, 2006 and October 4, 2009
- The Roots, Rock & Reggae Music Festival – August 16, 2006
- Lynyrd Skynyrd – September 1, 2006 and September 8, 2009
- The Australian Pink Floyd Show – October 30, 2006 and October 8, 2007
- Incubus – July 8, 2007
- INXS – August 24, 2007
- Snoop Dogg – September 8, 2007, June 18, 2010 and October 21, 2011
- George Benson – September 14, 2007, with Al Jarreau
- Alice in Chains – September 22, 2007, with Velvet Revolver and Sparta
- Daddy Yankee – September 29, 2007
- Heaven & Hell – October 4, 2007, with Alice Cooper and Queensrÿche
- RBD – October 13, 2007 and March 28, 2008
- Vance Gilbert – October 14, 2007
- Pepe Aguilar – October 17, 2007, July 9, 2010 and November 11, 2011
- KoЯn – October 23, 2007, with Hellyeah, Droid and Five Finger Death Punch
- Joan Sebastian – October 26, 2007, April 30, May 6 and July 30, 2011 and April 30, 2012
- Gwen Stefani – October 29, 2007
- Los Tigres del Norte – March 29, 2008, August 4, 2012 and August 10, 2013
- Jenni Rivera – April 12, 2008, November 12, 2010 and November 18, 2011
- Juanes – April 27, 2008 and May 30, 2013
- Bonnie Raitt – May 16, 2008, with The Robert Cray Band
- The Charlie Daniels Band – June 1, 2008, with .38 Special
- Belanova – June 21, 2008, with Camila
- The Stone Temple Pilots – June 25, 2008, with Black Francis
- Intocable – June 27, 2008 and June 26, 2009
- Boston – June 29, 2008, with Styx and July 23, 2014
- Steely Dan – July 22, 2008
- Lyle Lovett – August 7, 2008, with Shawn Colvin
- Alicia Keys – September 28, 2008
- Earth, Wind & Fire – October 1, 2008, with Michael McDonald, May 27, 2011 and July 31, 2012
- Los Temerarios – April 18, 2009
- Led Zepagain – March 11, 2010
- Chayanne – May 22, 2010
- Roger Daltrey & The No Plan B Band – June 22, 2010
- Robert Plant & The Band of Joy – July 21, 2010
- Rihanna – July 22, 2010, with Kesha and Travie McCoy
- Ramón Ayala – August 14, 2010, August 27, 2011, October 12, 2013, with Los Tucanes de Tijuana and Pancho Barraza and October 14, 2014, with Larry Hernandez
- Cyndi Lauper – August 15, 2010, with David Rhodes
- The Gary Hoey Band – August 19, 2010
- KMIY 92.9's Mountain Winter Wonder Jam – December 11, 2010
- The Moody Blues – May 11, 2011
- Billy Ray Cyrus – May 20, 2011
- The Bret Michaels Band – May 21, 2011
- The Experience Hendrix Tour – May 24, 2011
- Espinoza Paz – June 11, 2011
- Emilio Navaira – June 18, 2011, with Sunny Sauceda
- The Doobie Brothers – June 22, 2011 and July 11, 2012, with Chicago
- Wiz Khalifa – June 29, 2011, with Big Sean and Chevy Woods
- Banda el Recodo – July 9, 2011
- Peter Frampton – July 27, 2011 and August 31, 2014, with B.B. King, Buddy Guy and Robert Randolph
- Chicago – August 2, 2011
- The Vince Neil Band – August 28, 2011
- Maroon 5 – September 18, 2011, with Train and Matt Nathanson
- Evanescence – October 15, 2011, with The Pretty Reckless and The Rival Sons
- Judas Priest – October 18, 2011, with Thin Lizzy and The Black Label Society
- Blue Highway – October 29–30, 2011
- Ozomatli – November 1, 2011
- Daughtry – November 4, 2011
- Tim McGraw – November 12, 2011
- The B-52's – January 15, 2012
- The Robert Cray Band – April 13, 2012, with The Kenny Wayne Shepherd Band
- Bon Iver – April 23, 2012, with Feist
- The Beach Boys – April 24, 2012
- Chickenfoot – May 31, 2012, with Black Stone Cherry
- Huey Lewis and the News – July 15, 2012, with Joe Cocker
- Warrant – July 20, 2012, with Skid Row and L.A. Guns
- Pitbull – August 5, 2012 and October 24, 2013
- The All-American Rejects – August 9, 2012
- Duran Duran – August 12, 2012
- George Clinton – August 17, 2012
- The Lost 80's: Live! – August 18, 2012
- Great White – September 1, 2012, with Slaughter and Lynch Mob and October 11, 2013, with The Vince Neil Band
- Neal McCoy – September 7, 2012
- Def Leppard – September 12, 2012, with Poison and Lita Ford
- Brit Floyd: The Pink Floyd Tribute Show – September 26, 2012
- Mac Miller – October 4, 2012, with Travis Porter
- John Fogerty – October 18, 2012
- The Tucson Desert Bluegrass Festival – October 27–28, 2012
- The Counting Crows – November 16, 2012 and August 6, 2014, with Toad the Wet Sprocket
- Tiësto – December 5, 2012, with Zedd
- Heart – February 15 and November 9, 2013
- Phoenix – April 9, 2013, with Mac DeMarco
- Travis Tritt – April 17, 2013
- Sixto Rodriguez – April 19, 2013, with Giant Squid
- Dokken – May 10, 2013, with Ratt and Trixter
- Il Divo – May 17, 2013
- LL Cool J – May 23, 2013, with Ice Cube, Public Enemy and De La Soul
- Cheap Trick – June 16, 2013, with Pat Benatar
- Big Time Rush – June 26, 2013, with Olivia Somerlyn and Jackson Guthy
- The West Coast Hip Hop Festival – July 12, 2013
- Sugar Ray – July 14, 2013, with Smash Mouth, Gin Blossoms, Vertical Horizon and Fastball
- Matchbox 20 – July 27, 2013
- Florida Georgia Line – July 28, 2013, with Charlie Worsham
- KLPX 96.1's Birthday Bash – August 6, 2013
- Willie Nelson & Family – August 14, 2013
- Cameo – August 17, 2013
- Kid Cudi – September 5, 2013
- Creedence Clearwater Revisited – September 12, 2013
- Marc Anthony – September 14, 2013
- The Desert Bluegrass Association Band Contest Show – October 25, 2013
- The Tucson Tamal & Heritage Festival – December 7, 2013
- Gavin DeGraw – June 13, 2014, with Matt Nathanson
- Lady Antebellum – June 17, 2014
- Smokey Robinson – June 28, 2014
- Keith Sweat – July 26, 2014, with Ginuwine and Al B. Sure!
- Prince Royce – August 9, 2014
- The Desert Rocks SeptemberFest – September 27, 2014
- Skrillex – October 7, 2014, with DJ Mustard, Branchez and David Heartbreak
- 112 – November 15, 2014

== See also ==
- List of contemporary amphitheatres
