= Texas Band of Yaqui Indians =

Cultural organization in Texas

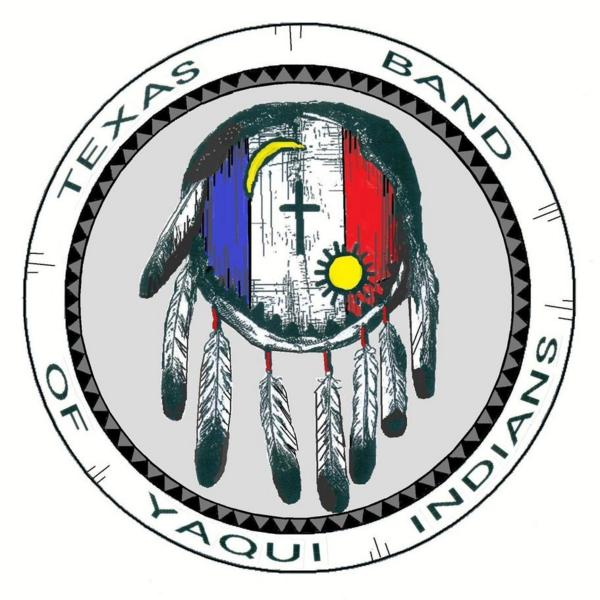
- Seal of the Texas Band of Yaqui Indians
- Named after: Yaqui people
- Formation: Nonprofit: 2019
- Founder: Israel "Iz" Sotel Ramirez
- Founded at: Lubbock, Texas
- Type: Nonprofit organization
- Tax ID no.: EIN 45-3612050
- Legal status: active
- Location: Lubbock, Texas
- Members: 1,500
- Official language: English
- President: Vanessa Burleson
- Website: tbyi.gov

The Texas Band of Yaqui Indians is a Yaqui cultural organization and nonprofit in Lubbock, Texas. The band is unrecognized and is not a federally recognized tribe or a state-recognized tribe.

The State of Texas has worked with the band for various administrative purposes. In 2015, it was acknowledged by congratulatory resolution in the state of Texas under Texas Senate Resolution 989. A 2016 Certificate of Congressional Recognition from U.S. Representative Randy Neugebauer (19th District, Texas) commemorated the tribe's honorary recognition.

== Nonprofit ==
The Texas Band of Yaqui Indians incorporated as a 501(c)(3) nonprofit organization in 2019. Its focus is cultural, ethnic awareness. Vanessa Burleson serves as its president.

== History ==
In 1978, the Pascua Yaqui Tribe in Arizona obtained federal recognition, but many Yaqui people living outside Arizona—often from different villages and migration histories—were not included in that federal roll. In the 1990s, Israel "Iz" Sotel Ramirez began organizing Yaqui descendants in Texas, documenting family lineages that connected them to Yaqui communities in Sonora and Arizona. The group was formally organized as a tribal association in 1995, and later incorporated a nonprofit arm to support cultural and community programs.

== Acknowledgment ==
The Texas Band of Yaqui Indians has been acknowledged by the Texas Senate through a congratulatory resolution. This means it is not legally recognized at the state or federal level but it has administrative recognition for certain internal state purposes. On 27 May 2015, the 84th Texas Legislature adopted Senate Resolution 989, which "recognize[s] and honor[s] the members of the Texas Band of Yaqui Indians" and directs that an official copy of the resolution be prepared for the tribe "as an expression of esteem from the Texas Senate". The Texas Band of Yaqui Indians aims to seek federal recognition in future.

== Activities ==
The Texas Band of Yaqui Indians engages in cultural programming, including demonstration dances and storytelling. The band has participated in events such as Native American Heritage Month activities at Lubbock Christian University and other educational and community programs. The organization supports the study of the Yoeme language and Yaqui cultural traditions as part of its mission.

== Members ==
In 2017, the organization had about 1,500 members.

Chaplain Jose Anguamea Villegas, also known as Joseph L. Villegas Sr., an official associated with the Texas Band of Yaqui Indians, serves as a National Guard chaplain and has been an advocate for the protection of Native cultural and environmental sites, including Chaco Culture National Historical Park in New Mexico. Villegas has also appeared in reporting on water‑contamination issues impacting Native communities in the Southwest.

Dance scholar and choreographer Sam Aros‑Mitchell, enrolled with the Texas Band of Yaqui Indians, has served as a postdoctoral scholar at Arizona State University’s Center for Imagination in the Borderlands and has taught at institutions including Macalester College and the University of California San Diego. His work has been supported by fellowships and commissions from organizations such as the McKnight Choreographer Fellowship program and the Guthrie Theater.
