= Anselmo Valencia Tori =

Native American leader (1921–1998)

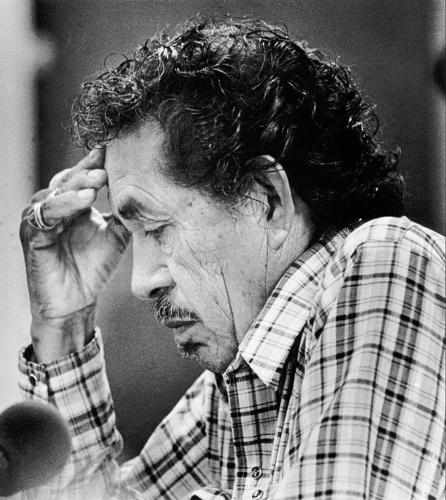
Valencia at a press conference on August 24, 1984

Anselmo Valencia Tori (April 21, 1921 – May 2, 1998) was the former chairman of the Pascua Yaqui Association, former vice-chairman of the Pascua Yaqui Tribal Council and Elder of the tribe. Raised in southern Arizona and Rio Yaqui, Mexico, Anselmo adopted his second surname as a young man. ”Tori” is the family's clan name. His wife was Kathy Ann (née) Nordin. Their marriage took place on April 26, 1992, in Las Vegas, Nevada.

== Early life ==
Anselmo was born in Sonora, Mexico on April 21. 1921. His father was Francisco A. Valencia (b. 1885), and his mother was Placida Laborin (b. 1886). In 1930 the family lived in Bacadéhuachi, Sonora, a small village along the Bavispe River, which constitutes the upper stream of the Yaqui River. Anselmos's father worked in agriculture, and the economy of Bacadéhuachiis almost entirely based on agriculture and cattle raising, both of which are poorly developed due to the shortage of water. Along with his father and mother, Anselmo had three brothers and two sisters at this time.

== Accomplishments ==
Anselmo was inducted into the United States Army on October 22, 1942, during the early part of World War II. A veteran with only a Grammar school education, he became a teacher, tribal historian, and the political and spiritual leader of the Yaqui peoples. He was noted by the Arizona House of Representatives as the driving force behind the Yaqui tribe's efforts to obtain Federal recognition as well as historic tribe designation. An authority on Yaqui culture, he helped establish the non-profit Yoemem Tekia Foundation in 1989, which is dedicated to preserving and perpetuating Yaqui Indian culture.

== Tribal rights ==
He was a major political figure in the Yaqui tribe. In 1964 and 1965, serving as executive director of The Pascua Yaqui Association, he managed federal funds allocated through President Lyndon B. Johnson's newly founded Office of Economic Opportunity. The funds were used for new construction projects, including a church, and for adult education programs, vocational training, and summer youth programs. He strove to gain economic development opportunities as well as social and medical services. He also supported tribal efforts in the traditional Pueblos in Rio Yaqui, Sonora, Mexico. In addition, he worked toward achieving self-determination, tribal sovereignty, and human rights for the Pascua Yaqui. He did not recognize the political boundaries between Mexico and the United States, and waged long battles to gain land and water rights for the traditional pueblos in Rio Yaqui.

== Death ==
Anselmo died in Tucson, Arizona on May 2, 1998. He was 77 years of age. He was interred at the Monte Calvario Cemetery in Tucson.
