= Agua Prieta pipeline =

The Agua Prieta pipeline (Spanish: gasoducto Agua Prieta) is a natural gas pipeline project by Sempra Energy that aims to move natural gas from the U.S. state of Arizona to the Mexican states of Sonora and Sinaloa. The pipeline will cross the Yaqui River (Rio Yaqui), the main water source for the Yaqui, an indigenous tribe. The pipeline has an approximate length of 833 km upon completion, approximately 90 km of which will go through Yaqui territory. Some of the Yaqui community strongly oppose the pipeline and have campaigned against it.

== Geography and description ==
The Agua Prieta pipeline is a natural gas pipeline project by IENova (a subsidiary of San Diego based Sempra Energy) that aims to move natural gas from the U.S. state of Arizona to the northern Mexican states of Sonora and Sinaloa. The Yaqui Valley is fed by numerous tributaries which drain the eastern highlands as they flow from the escarpment of the Sierra Madre Occidental to the Gulf of California. The pipeline received a permit from the Mexican government approving its construction; gas distributed through the pipeline will go to the Comisión Federal de Electricidad, the national electric utility of Mexico.

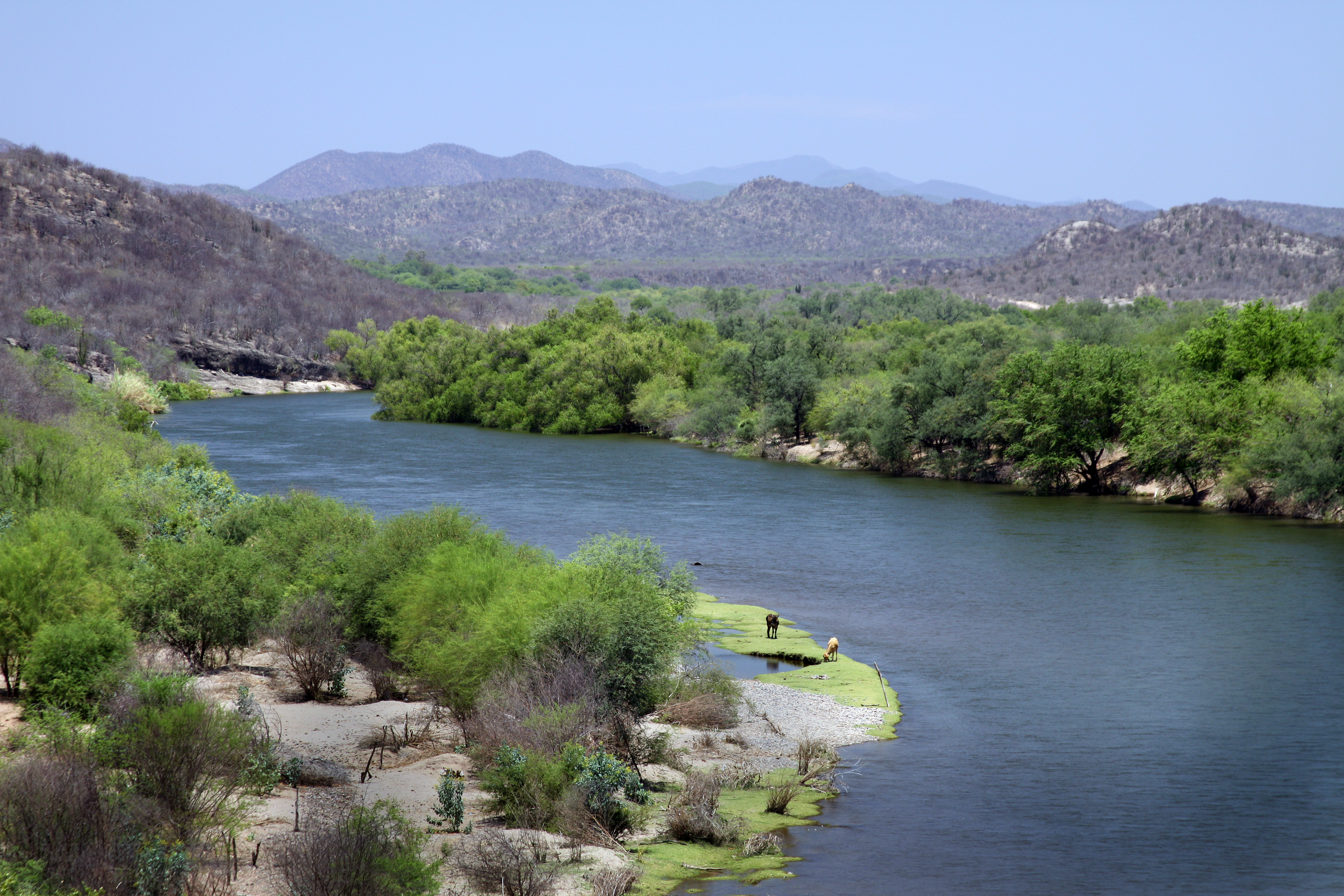
The river through which the Agua Prieta Pipeline will pass through.

Currently, the Agua Prieta pipeline consists of a 13 km pipeline that is 20 inches in diameter, having entered into operation in 2002. Once complete, the pipeline will be about 833 km long. The first portion of the pipeline that is currently undergoing construction is 505 km with 36 inches in diameter, and will transport natural gas from Sásabe to Guaymas, Sonora. The second portion of the pipeline is planned to be 330 km with 30 inches in diameter, and will transport natural gas from Guaymas to El Oro, Sinaloa.

== History ==
On December 12, 2013, the Mexican lower house voted by a two-thirds majority to end government control of Mexico's oil, historically opening up the nation to private companies and foreign investments after decades of nationalized oil. While project managers hail this pipeline as the bringer of clean and low-cost energy, Loma de Bácum (the Yaqui holdout community) remain skeptical.

== Opposition ==
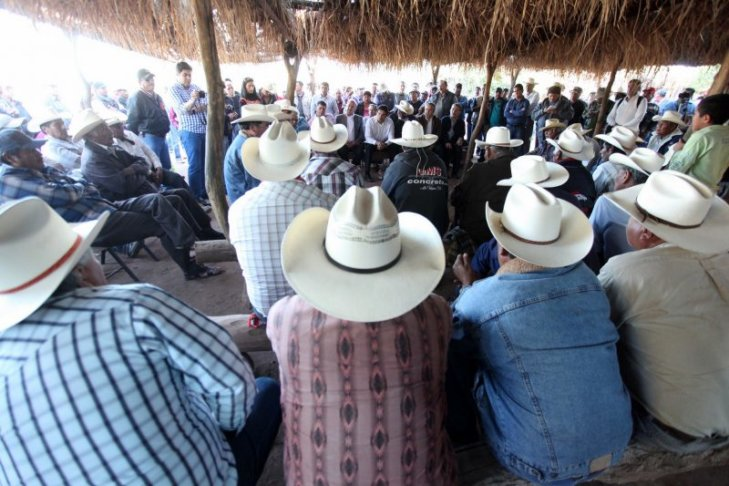
Yaqui community gatherings

Yaqui territory is protected by the Mexican constitution and law which guarantees indigenous community land rights. Mexico, along with other Latin American countries, are signatories to the International Labour Organization (ILO) Convention, which guards their rights and makes an informed consultation obligatory in the case of projects that affect their territories.

The Agua Prieta pipeline will cross the Yaqui River (Río Yaqui), the water source for the Yaqui, an indigenous tribe residing in the Yaqui Valley in Sonora, Mexico and the Southwestern United States. According to scholar Stephen V. Lutes, "the Yaqui are notoriously sensitive about the issue of autonomy, even today, and have shown a will to resist the encroachments of alien colonists and authority." Many past conflicts between the Yaqui and the Mexican government have focused on control over land and water. The anti-pipeline Solidaridad Tribu Yaqui group opposes the pipeline, saying that it infringes upon the territory and autonomy of the Yaqui and is a project of government and business violence. The rollback of environmental regulations by the Trump administration has further raised fears over the pipeline.

There are differences among the Yaqui over the pipeline, leading to sometimes violent confrontation. Opponents of the project say that the pipeline will cross 90 kilometers into Yaqui territory in violation of Mexican law and that "building the pipeline without consultations that are deemed to be fair, transparent, and inclusive for all of the Yaqui communities would be a violation of the sovereignty of Yaqui land." Yaqui activist Plutarco Flores, for example, told Inter Press Service (IPS), "We were not asked or informed. We want to be consulted, we want our rights to be respected. We are defending our territory, our environment." In one consultation in May 2015, the Yaqui voted against the pipeline. Yaqui members from Loma de Bácum secured a moratorium temporarily blocking pipeline construction.

Despite the opposition from indigenous communities, construction continued, "allegedly with the support of government officials and the Yaqui members from the community of Loma de Guamúchil." In October 2016, there was a clash at Loma de Bácum involving the use of "machetes, clubs, rocks, and firearms." One protester was fatally shot, eight were injured, and there was "significant property damage" including the burning of cars. In December 2016, Yaqui activist and lawyer María Anabela Carlón Flores and her husband, Isabel Lugo Molina, were kidnapped at gunpoint by unknown masked men before eventually being released. Following the abduction, Carlón Flores filed a complaint with the office of the Sonora state prosecutor (the Procuraduría General de Justicia del Estado en Sonora) and the State Commission on Human Rights (the Comisión Estatal de Derechos Humanos). Carlón Flores accuses the State Public Security Police (Policía Estatal de Seguridad Pública) of being complicit in the kidnapping. Carlón Flores told La Jornada that the masked men had seized her husband and taken him to a car that was being guarded by the State Police.

== See also ==
- Kinder Morgan Trans Mountain Pipeline System — TransMountain Pipeline expansion project has encountered opposition from the Suquamish and other indigenous tribes
- Dakota Access Pipeline protests at Standing Rock
