= Álvaro Obregón Dam =

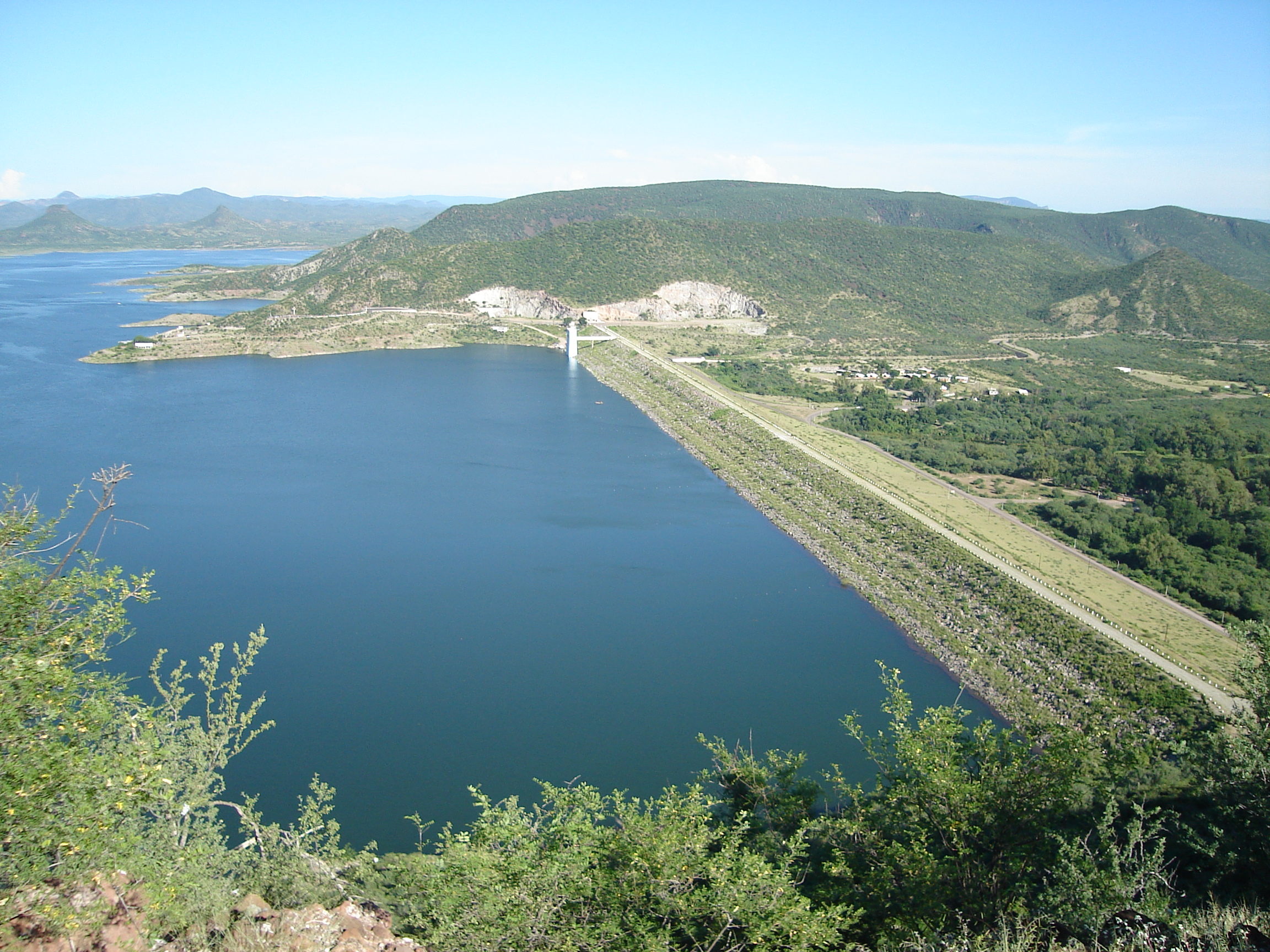
- Upstream side of dam in 2006

- Location within Mexico
- Official name: Presa Oviáchic
- Country: Mexico
- Location: Cajeme, Sonora
- Coordinates: 27°49′21″N 109°53′34″W
- Status: In use
- Construction began: 1947
- Opening date: 1952

Dam and spillways
- Type of dam: Embankment
- Impounds: Yaqui River
- Height: 57 m (187 ft)
- Length: 1,457 m (4,780 ft)

Reservoir
- Creates: Lake Oviáchic
- Total capacity: 3,226,000,000 m^{3} (2,615,361 acre⋅ft)
- Surface area: 208 km^{2} (80 sq mi)

Power Station
- Operator: Comisión Federal de Electricidad
- Commission date: 28 August 1957
- Turbines: 2
- Installed capacity: 19 MW

The Álvaro Obregón Dam (also known as the Oviáchic Dam) is an embankment dam on the Yaqui River north of Ciudad Obregón, in Sonora, Mexico. The purpose of the dam is water supply for irrigation, flood control and hydroelectric power production. The dam supports a power station with two generators and a 19 MW installed capacity.

== Background ==
Because of drought, the Álvaro Obregón Dam and others on the Sonora and Mayo Rivers were constructed in the 1940s and 1950s. Construction on the Álvaro Obregón Dam began in 1947 and was complete in 1952. The dam's power station was not operational until August 1957. The dam is 57 m (187 ft) above the riverbed and 1,457 m (4,780 ft) long. The dam has an additional saddle dam 2 km (1 mi) to its northwest and along with a system of canals, it helps irrigate 83% of a 232,999 ha (900 sq mi) area. Because of drought in the 1990s and 2000s, 2004 was the first year that water from the dam's reservoir was not authorized for irrigation.

== See also ==
- List of power stations in Mexico
