= Mario Martinez =

Mario Martinez may refer to:

== Arts and entertainment ==
- Mario Martinez (painter) (born 1953), contemporary abstract painter
- Mario Iván Martínez (born 1962), Mexican actor

== Sportspeople ==
=== Association football ===
- Mario Martínez (footballer, born 1985), Spanish football midfielder
- Mario Martínez (footballer, born 1989), Honduran football attacking midfielder

=== Other sports ===
- Mario Martinez (weightlifter) (1957–2018), American Olympic weightlifter
- Mario Martínez (tennis) (born 1961), Bolivian tennis player
- Mario Martínez (boxer) (born 1965), former Mexican boxer

== Other ==
- Mario Aburto Martínez (born 1971), Mexican assassin
- Mario Vilella Martínez (born 1995), Spanish tennis player
