= Muriel Thayer Painter =

American anthropologist and social worker (1892–1975)

Muriel Thayer Painter (6 March 1892 – March 1975) was an American anthropologist and social worker who researched and advocated for the Yaqui. Her anthropology research focused on the Yaqui Easter ceremony.

== Early life and education ==
Muriel Thayer was born on March 6, 1892, in Minneapolis, Minnesota. She attended the University of Minnesota and was in the class of 1915. She was involved as a member of Kappa Alpha Theta, the Theta Epsilon Literary Society, and the Young Women's Christian Association while at the university in 1913. She later graduated from Wellesley College in 1916 with a social work degree.

Thayer married Carl W. Painter. She was working for the Red Cross in 1920. The couple had one daughter, named Elizabeth Painter. By 1940, the couple had divorced, and Muriel Thayer Painter was living in Tucson, Arizona.

== Involvement with the Yaqui ==
In 1939, Muriel Thayer Painter accompanied Bronislaw Malinowski, a member of the Department of Anthropology at the University of Arizona to a Yaqui Easter ceremony at Pascua Yaqui Indian Village. Painter went on to attend various Yaqui Easter ceremonies and festivities every year from 1939 to 1954, taking detailed notes. She interviewed many Yaqui between 1948 and 1975 as well. Painter is best known for her work on the Yaqui Easter ceremonies. She noted that these ceremonies uniquely mixed Spanish Catholicism with Yaqui tradition.

In 1944, Painter was hired as a research associate at the Arizona State Museum, which allowed her to continue her research in earnest.

Painter forged a close relationship with the Pascua Yaqui Indian Village community. While this relationship was filled with mutual respect and admiration, some Yaqui found Painter irritating because she would occasionally interrupt ceremonies to ask questions. While celebrated for her wide knowledge of the Yaqui and their culture, some aspects of Yaqui culture were intentionally shielded from her.

Painter was named the chairperson of the Tucson Chamber of Commerce's Yaqui Committee in 1942. In the 1940s and 1950s, Painter worked with the Tucson Chamber of Commerce to help the Yaqui market their Easter festivities as a tourist attraction. Before 1950, Painter had served as the Yaqui representative for the Tucson Folk Festival, when she turned over the role to a young Yaqui leader. Similarly, as Program Chair of the Tucson Festival Society, Painter helped organize the first annual San Xavier Fiesta in 1952. In these roles, Painter was hailed for helping the Yaqui showcase their culture.

The Yaqui hoped Painter and her work could help sway Congress and the Bureau of Indian Affairs to officially recognize the tribe and approve a Yaqui reservation. Her 1962 pamphlet Faith, Flowers, and Fiestas was part of this project. Painter also assisted the Yaqui with a media campaign in the 1960s. The Yaqui hoped Painter's pamphlet and work would prove their "authenticity" as American Indians to Congress. Painter and the Yaqui's work were eventually successful and the Yaqui were federally recognized.

In the 1960s, Painter served as the chair of the Housing Committee at Pascua and the chair of the Pascua Yaqui Association. The committee determined a new tract of land was needed because beginning in the 1950s, the Pascua Yaqui Indian Village had been encroached upon by an expanding Tucson, bringing more industry and crime nearby. She helped create New Pascua village, where the Yaqui near Tucson currently reside.

In 1964, Painter began working with a Yaqui man named Refugio Savala, whose health was failing at the time, to write a memoir with a focus on Yaqui culture. Savala had worked with Painter before, helping her translate various works in Yaqui. Savala's memoir was eventually published as The Autobiography of a Yaqui Poet.

Painter frequently served as a liaison for other researchers visiting Tucson and the Pascua Yaqui Indian Village.

== Death ==
Painter's most significant anthropological work and only monograph was published after her death in March 1975. Revised by Edward Spicer and Wilma Kaemlein, her work was published as With Good Heart: Yaqui Beliefs and Ceremonies in Pascua Village in 1986.
