= Merced Maldonado =

Native American artist

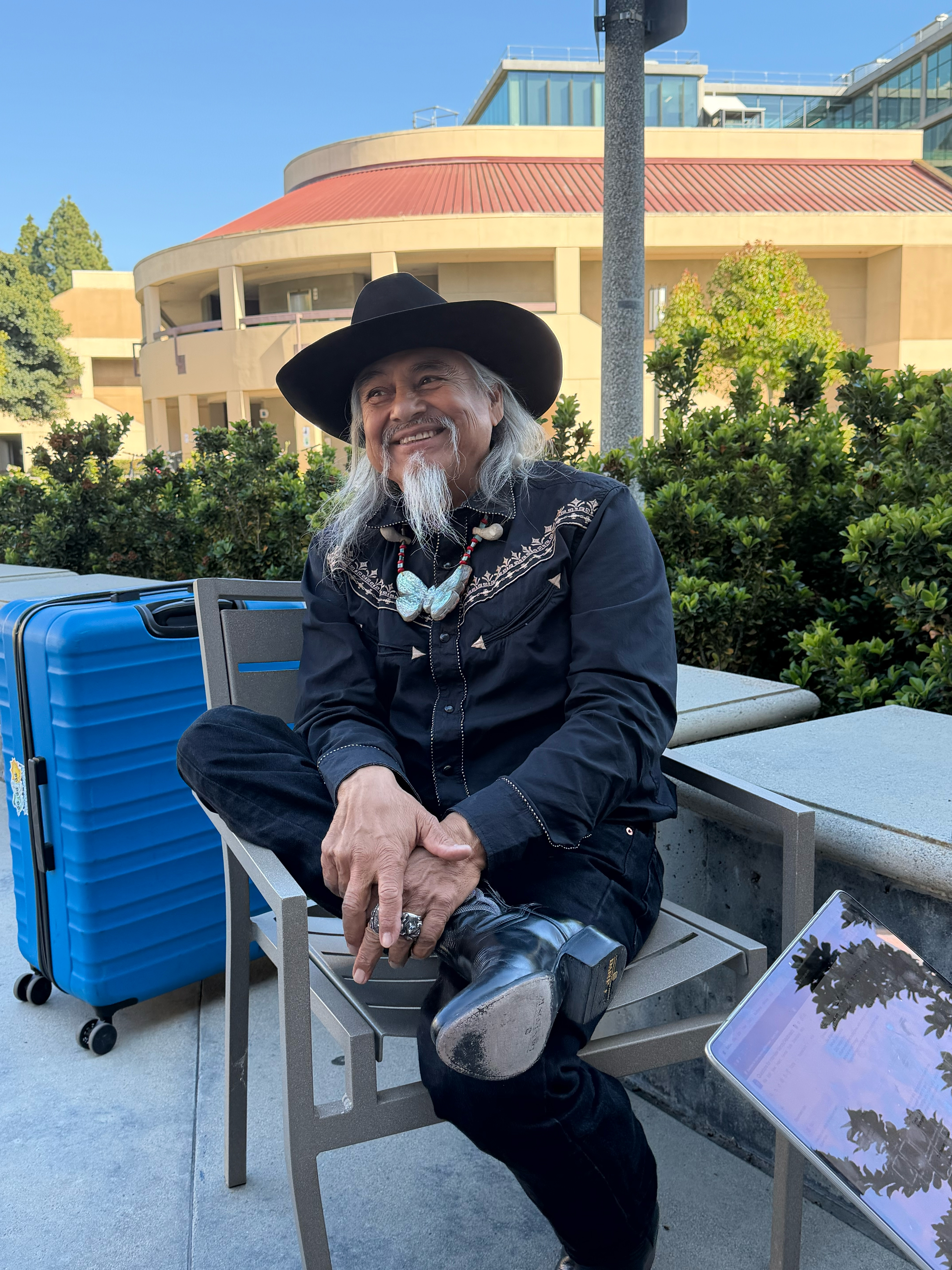
- Born: 1956 (age 69–70); Phoenix, Arizona, US
- Citizenship: Pascua Yaqui Tribe of Arizona and United States
- Education: South Mountain Community College
- Known for: Woodcarving

Merced Maldonado (born 1956) is a Native American artist, mask maker, and pascola dancer. He is a member of the Pascua Yaqui Tribe. He grew up in Guadalupe, Arizona and lives on the Pascua Yaqui Reservation in Tucson, Arizona.

== Early life and education ==
Maldonado is the grandson of Yaqui artist Loreto Luna, who was the interpreter for Frances Densmore's 1932 ethnomusicology book, Yaqui and Yuman Music. Maldonado studied biology at the South Mountain Community College in Phoenix, Arizona.

== Art Career ==
Maldonado is a pascola dancer and contemporary carver who uses the wood of the coral tree, the elephant tree, and cottonwood to fashion Yaqui masks and rattles. His masks, rattles, and bead work are part of the permanent collection of the Heard Museum in Phoenix, Arizona and the Florida Museum of Natural History in Gainesville, Florida.

Maldonado is also a lecturer on the subject of Yaqui dance, musical instruments, and mask making as it relates to traditional pascola dancing. In 2004, Maldonado visited the University of Incarnate Word in San Antonio, Texas and spoke on the cultural traditions of his tribe using stories, dance, and music. He subsequently presented on Yaqui culture and mask making at the Congress on Research in Dance 38th Annual Conference at Arizona State University in Tempe, Arizona in 2006. In 2026 he received a Walking Together individual award from the non-profit Creative West organization based in Denver, Colorado to expand his teaching offerings related to indigenous ceremonial dance and regalia.

== Contributions to Entomology ==
Around 2004, Maldonado contacted entomologist Richard S. Peigler for help in locating wild silkmoths, insects whose cocoons are sewn into ankle rattles worn by Yaqui pascola and deer dancers. This resulted in a collaboration by Peigler and Maldonado on the use of cocoons by Yaqui and Mayo Indians. Maldonado said the cocoons had been plentiful in southern Arizona until the early 1990s. In 2005, Maldonado began cultivating two species of wild silkmoths in his home in Guadalupe, Arizona. In a 2026 lecture to students at the University of California, Irvine, Maldonado stated "objects placed inside the cocoons to produce sound often hold a meaningful connection to the person wearing them".

== Collections ==
- Heard Museum, Phoenix, Arizona
- Florida Museum of Natural History, Gainesville, Florida

== Exhibits, Grants, Awards and Special Projects ==
- HOME: Native People in the Southwest, Exhibit, Heard Museum, 2005.
- Yaqui Pascola: Indigenous Ceremonial Dances, Regalia, Knowledge Keeper, Material Culture. Walking Together Individual Grant Awardee, Creative West, Denver, CO, 2026.

== Bibliography ==
- Peigler, Richard S. and Merced Maldonado. "Uses of cocoons of Eupackardia calleta and Rothschildia cincta (Lepidoptera: Saturniidae) by Yaqui Indians in Arizona and Mexico," Nachrichten des Entomologischen Vereins Apollo 26(3): 111–119, 2005.
