= Lake Oviáchic =

Lake Ouiachic
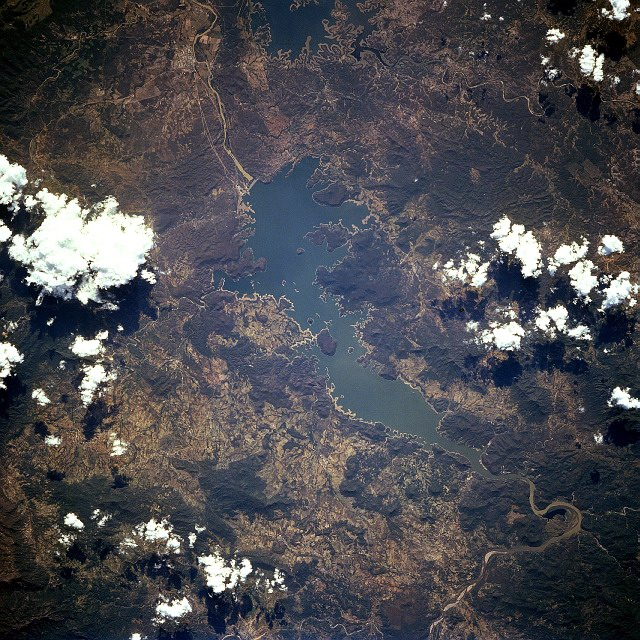
- from space, October 1994

- Location within Mexico
- Location: Sierra Madre Occidental, Cajeme, Sonora, Mexico
- Coordinates: 27.8722°N 109.8640°W
- Type: reservoir
- Primary inflows: Yaqui River
- Primary outflows: Yaqui River
- Basin countries: Mexico
- Max. length: 19.6 km (12.2 mi)
- Max. width: 7.8 km (4.8 mi)
- Islands: numerous islands and islets

Lake Ouiachic (also referred to as the Álvaro Obregón Reservoir) is located in the foothills of the Sierra Madre Occidental and is created by the Álvaro Obregón Dam. Lake Ouiachic is fed by and drained by the Yaqui River. The dam was completed in 1952 with the purpose to regulate water flow of the Yaqui River, prevent floods, and generate electricity. Lake Ouiachic is also an expanding tourist and resort area specializing in fishing, boating, and water skiing.
