= Thamar Richey =

- Born: August 8, 1858; Saltsburg, Pennsylvania
- Died: October 20, 1937 (aged 79); Tucson, Arizona
- Known for: Educational work with the Pascua Yaqui Tribe

Thamar Richey (August 8, 1858- October 20, 1937) was an educator, known for her work with the Yaqui community in Arizona.

== Biography ==
Thamar Richey was born on August 8, 1858, in Saltsburg, Pennsylvania. As a child, she moved to Illinois and Missouri, where she graduated from Maryvale High School at sixteen. In 1874, she obtained a teaching job in Ottawa County. She went on to teach in other schools. In 1879, she moved to Kansas with her family, where she continued to teach.

In 1892, Richey took a teaching position with the Federal Indian Service. She was assigned to a school on the Fort Mojave Indian Reservation and then became the head matron at the Haskell Institute, later moving to be the principal at Indian schools in Nebraska and Minnesota. In 1901, Richey returned to Holton, Kansas, to be with her ill parents. She served on the faculty of the Emporia Normal School teachers' college and at a small local college.

In 1919, Richey took a job teaching near Greaterville, Arizona to be near her brother. In 1923, she moved to Tucson, but there were no open teaching positions. Richey asked school superintendent C.E. Rose if he would approve a job if she could find a school. Richey created a school for Pascua Yaqui Tribe students, using a small ceremonial site as a makeshift school, where she initially taught kindergarten and 1-C (pre-first grade). The school taught students to speak English, and they then went elsewhere for elementary and grammar school education. Richey successfully advocated for the Tuscan School Board to build a schoolroom, even though the children lived outside the district. Initially, Richey, unable to speak Yaqui, required two interpreters, one to translate her English into Spanish, and the other to translate Spanish into Yaqui.

Richey acted as a patroness for the Yaqui community. She worked with local nonprofits to distribute clothing, food, and other items at Pascua. From the winter of 1924 to 1925, Richey prepared lunch for her students in a sort of early-day free school lunch program. During the Great Depression, Richey begged for food and clothing for her students, whose families were greatly struggling. Richey worked directly with families, rather than going through community or missionary leadership, which was common.

== Death and legacy ==
Richey retired in 1937. She died on October 14, 1937, in her home in Tucson, Arizona. The Yaqui elders held a candlelight vigil for her, and the village attended her funeral.

In 1955, the Tucson Board of Education built the Richey Elementary School, named in honor of Richey.

In 1988, Richey was inducted into the Arizona Women's Hall of Fame.
