= Resolution (law) =

Often non-binding statement of intent in law

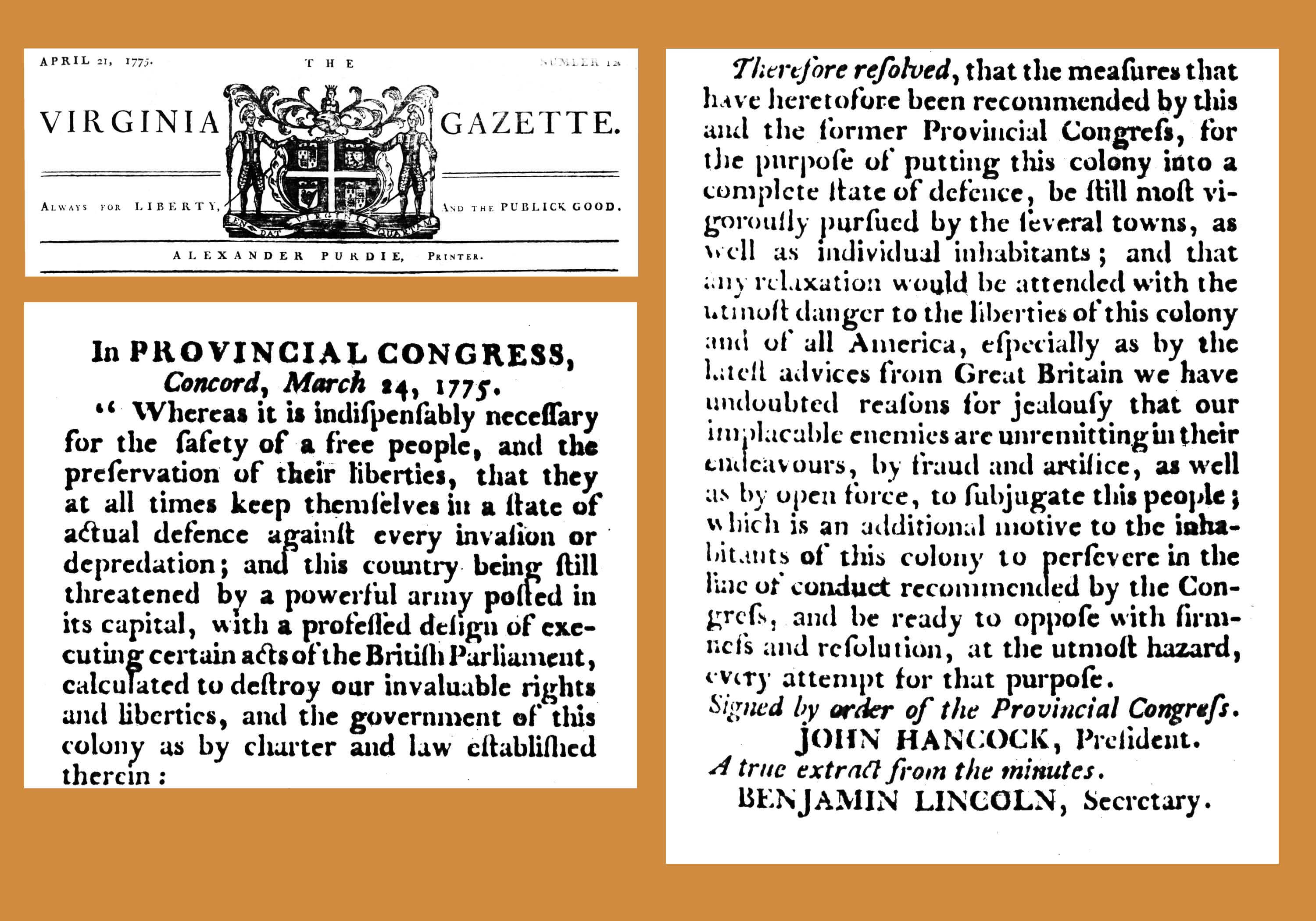
This March 24, 1775 resolution of the Massachusetts Provincial Congress, signed by John Hancock weeks before the battles of Lexington and Concord, calls for the colony to be put into "a complete state of defense". Resolutions are often preceded by "Whereas..." clauses that express reasons or justifications for the ensuing resolution.

In law, a resolution is a motion, often in writing (Note: Long or important motions are often written so that it can be distributed outside the body after its adoption.), which has been adopted by a deliberative body (such as a corporations' board and or the house of a legislature). An alternate term for a resolution is a resolve.

== In corporations ==
In corporations, a written resolution is especially useful in the case of the board of directors of a corporation, which usually needs to give its consent to real estate purchases or sales by the corporation. Such a resolution, when certified by the corporation's secretary, gives assurance to the other side of the transaction that the sale was properly authorized. Other examples include resolutions approving the opening of bank accounts or authorizing the issuance of shares in the corporation.

== Legislative bodies ==
In many legislative bodies, the term resolution is used to describe a motion which has been approved.

In the United States, resolution means a proposal made in writing, while motion means a proposal made verbally.

Houses of a legislature often adopt non-binding resolutions.

However, a legislature also uses resolutions to exercise one of its binding powers that isn't a lawmaking power. For example, the United States Congress declares war or proposes constitutional amendments by adopting a joint resolution. A house of a legislature can also use a resolution to exercise its specific powers, as the British House of Commons does to elect its Speaker or as the United States House of Representatives does to impeach an officer of the government.

== Types ==
=== Non-binding ===
In a house of a legislature, the term non-binding resolution refers to measures that do not become laws. This is used to differentiate those measures from a bill, which is also a resolution in the technical sense. The resolution is often used to express the body's approval or disapproval of something which they cannot otherwise vote on, due to the matter being handled by another jurisdiction, or being protected by a constitution. An example would be a resolution of support for a nation's troops in battle, which carries no legal weight, but is adopted for moral support.

=== Substantive and procedural ===
Substantive resolutions apply to essential legal principles and rules of right, analogous to substantive law, in contrast to procedural resolutions, which deal with the methods and means by which substantive items are made and administered.

== Historical examples of resolutions ==
- Gulf of Tonkin Resolution
- Kentucky and Virginia Resolutions
- United Nations General Assembly resolutions
- United Nations Security Council resolutions
- War Powers Resolution

== See also ==
- Courtesy resolution
- Main motion
- Preamble
