= Pilar Thomas =

Native American lawyer

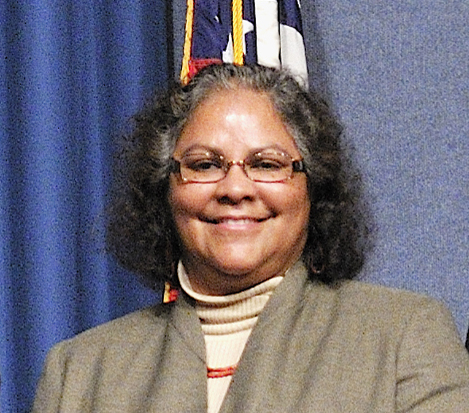

Personal details
- Born: Germany
- Education: Stanford University (BA); University of New Mexico, Albuquerque (JD)

Pilar M. Thomas is an American lawyer and a member of the Pascua Yaqui Tribe of Arizona, for which she has served as attorney. She has worked on water rights, treaty rights, gaming law, and coordinated federal agency policies and efforts in tribal energy development. In addition to working in the U.S. Departments of Justice and Energy, she has served as the Deputy Solicitor of Indian Affairs for the U.S. Department of the Interior. Thomas participated in negotiations for the U.S. adoption of the United Nations’ Declaration on the Rights of Indigenous People, and the Department of Interior’s tribal lands leasing reform.

== Early life and education ==
Thomas was born in Germany, where her father was serving in the U.S. Army and grew up in Southern California. Her mother's family came from Mexico and Arizona.

She gained a B.A. in economics from Stanford University in 1983, and graduated with a J.D. magna cum laude from the University of New Mexico School of Law in 2002, and is a member of the Order of the Coif. She was admitted to the Bar in Arizona in 2002.

== Career ==
After working in a financial services industry company for 15 years, Thomas decided to become a lawyer to work with her own and other tribes on economic development. She served the Pascua Yaqui Tribe and joined the law firm of Lewis and Roca LLP in Phoenix, specializing in tribal and gaming law.

In 2002, Thomas became a trial attorney in the U.S. Department of Justice, working on water and treaty rights. In 2009, she was appointed deputy solicitor for Indian Affairs in the U.S. Department of the Interior, providing legal advice on tribal law and issues related to Native Americans. She has said she regards the two most important parts of her work in government as participating in the interagency negotiations for the U.S. adoption of the United Nations Declaration on the Rights of Indigenous Peoples, and work on the Department of the Interior's tribal land leasing reform, including the HEARTH Act. She returned to Phoenix and the law firm of Lewis Roca Rothberger LLP in 2015.

In 2016, Thomas was one of a group of former Administration Native American officials who called on President Obama to block or reroute the Dakota Access pipeline (DAPL). Thomas is a member of the policy advisory committee of the National Tribal Air Association (NTAA).

== Honors ==
- Service Award from the U.S. Department of Justice for her work on the United States v. Michigan treaty rights litigation.
- The Best Lawyers in America - Native American Law, 2017.
