= Led Zepagain =

American hard rock tribute band

- Origin: Ventura, California, U.S.
- Genres: Hard rock; blues rock; folk rock
- Years active: 1988–present
- Labels: SMEJ
- Members: Swan Montgomery; Doug Baker; Scott Brooks; Anthony David Thymiakos
- Past members: Rick Snider; lead guitar Tracy Longo; Jim Wootten; Derek Smith; Bruce Corney: Christian Nesmith; Marc Sauer; Darryl Johnson; Lenny Mann; Jimmy Sakurai; Stan Taylor; Steve Zukowsky; Jim Kersey
- Website: zepagain.com

Led Zepagain (stylized Led ZepAgain) is an American hard rock tribute band formed in Ventura, California. The current band consists of vocalist/harmonica player Swan Montgomery ("Robert Plant"), Guitar/ Mandolin Anthony David Thymiakos ("Jimmy Page"), bassist/keyboardist/mandolinist Doug Baker ("John Paul Jones") and drummer/percussionist Scott Brooks ("John Bonham"). The group was formed in 1991 and is considered one of the first and top Zeppelin tribute bands in the world.

== Discography ==
- Led Zepagain: A Tribute To Led Zeppelin (2005)
- Led Zepagain II: A Tribute To Led Zeppelin (2007)
- Led Zepagain III: A Tribute To Led Zeppelin (2012)

Label: Titan Music Inc, D/B/A Titan Tribute Media

- Led Zepagain: The Sound Remains the Same Vol. 1 (2015)
- Led Zepagain: The Sound Remains the Same Vol. 2 (2015)

Label: Sony Music Entertainment Japan
