= Bacadéhuachi =

- Village
- Location in Mexico
- Coordinates: 29°48′0″N 109°8′0″W
- Country: Mexico
- State: Sonora
- Elevation: 2,790 ft (850 m)

Bacadéhuachi (Spanish pronunciation: [bakaˈðewatʃi]) is a village in Bacadéhuachi Municipality in the northeast of the Mexican state of Sonora. It is 269 kilometers northeast of the state capital, Hermosillo.

== Origin of the name and history ==
The name is derived from the Opata language with the roots "Baca", reed, "degua", entrance, door, and "tzi", place; "In the place of the reed".

Previously this area was inhabited by Opata settlements. Bacadéhuachi was founded in 1645 by the Jesuit missionary Cristóbal García as a Jesuit mission, named Mission San Luis Gonzága de Bacadéhuachi.

In 1930, the municipality of Bacadéhuachi was incorporated into the municipality of Bacerac, but in 1931, it was considered as a separate municipality, and the town of Bacadéhuachi was named as head municipal.

== Geography ==
The region is semi-arid and lies in the foothills of the Sierra Madre Occidental. The main river is the Bavispe. There are pine forests in the mountainous areas and wildlife is abundant. Mammals still present are deer, puma, lynx, coyote, jaguar, mapache, and skunk. Some of the birds are the owl, nightingale, buzzard, and eagle.

== Population decrease ==
The population has decreased since the last census in 1995 when there were 1,380 inhabitants. Scarce economic opportunities have caused many young people to emigrate. The population density is extremely low, with 0.88 inhabitants per square kilometer.

== Economy ==
The economy is almost entirely based on agriculture and cattle raising, both of which are poorly developed due to the shortage of water. There were approximately 11,000 head of cows in 2005.
