= Mario Martinez (painter) =

Native American contemporary abstract painter

- Born: 1953 (age 72–73); Phoenix, Arizona, US
- Citizenship: Pascua Yaqui Tribe of Arizona and United States
- Education: MFA, San Francisco Art Institute; BA, Arizona State University
- Known for: Painting

Mario Martinez (born 1953) is a Native American contemporary abstract painter. He is a member of the Pascua Yaqui Tribe from New Penjamo (in Scottsdale), the smallest of six Yaqui settlements, in Arizona. He lives in New York City.

He is represented by Pippy Houldsworth Gallery, London, and Garth Greenan Gallery, New York.

== Education ==
Martinez received his bachelor's degree from School of Art, Arizona State University in Tempe and his MFA from the San Francisco Art Institute.

== Art career ==
His work has been exhibited in 2005 in a one-person retrospective at the Smithsonian's National Museum of the American Indian in New York. Notable group exhibitions include: "Who Stole the Tee Pee?" at the National Museum of the American Indian, New York; "AlieNation" at the American Indian Community House Gallery. His work was recently shown at "IN/SIGHT 2010" at Chelsea Art Museum, New York and "The Importance of IN/VISIBILITY" at Abrazo Interno Gallery, New York, 2009. In 2002 Martinez was one of the first non-Japanese artists to be invited to exhibit at the Contemporary Artists Federation Group Show at the Museum of Modern Art, Saitama, Japan.

In 2000, Martinez was a visiting professor of art at the University of Arizona in Tucson, and in 2001 he received the Native Artist in Residence Fellowship from the National Museum of the American Indian. In 2005, Martinez completed a commission for the Heard Museum in Phoenix, Arizona; a 22-foot mural called Sonoran Desert: Yaqui Home as part of "Home: Desert Peoples in the Southwest" exhibition. Martinez had a solo exhibition at Mesa Contemporary Arts in Mesa, Arizona, in 2010.

== Selected exhibitions ==
- Stretching the Canvas: Eight Decades of Native Painting (2019–21), National Museum of the American Indian George Gustav Heye Center, New York.
- Into the Void: ABSTRACT ART, 1948 - 2008. Museum of Contemporary Art, Tucson, AZ, 2010.
- IN/SIGHT 2010 A group show of contemporary art by American Indian Artists, Chelsea Art Museum, New York, NY, 2010.
- The Importance of IN/VISIBILITY Recent work by Native American Artists living in New York City, Abrazo Interno Gallery, New York, NY, 2009.
- Native Voices: Contemporary Indigenous Art, Three Brooklyn Exhibitions, Kentler International Drawing Center, FiveMyles Gallery, Long Island University Salena and Humanities Gallery, New York, 2008.
- Mario Martinez and Steven Yazzie, Berlin Gallery, Heard Museum, Phoenix, AZ, 2007.
- Native New Yorkers, NESUD Gallery, Suffolk University, Boston, MA, 2007.
- New Tribe: New York: From Tradition to Transcendence, Mario Martinez Retrospective, National Museum of the American Indian, George Gustav Heye Center, New York City, NY, 2005.
- Home: Native People in the Southwest, Heard Museum, Phoenix, AZ, 2005.
- Indian Market Show, Lewallen Gallery, Santa Fe, NM, 2003.
- Mario Martinez: The last San Francisco paintings, Cakewalk, Phoenix, Arizona, 2003.
- Contemporary Artists Federation group show, Saitama Museum of Modern Art', Saitama, Japan, 2002.
- AlieNation, AICH Gallery, NY, NY, 2002. Rewritings: Painting from Native America, Artfit Exhibition Space, Phoenix, Arizona, 2002.
- who stole the tepee?, National Museum of the American Indian, George Gustav Heye Center, New York, New York, 2000.
- Fall, Jan Cicero Gallery, Chicago, Illinois, 1999.
- Solo Show, American Indian Contemporary Arts Gallery, San Francisco, CA, 1998.
- The Fall Antiquities and Contemporary Art Show, Denver Art Museum, Denver, CO, 1998.
- Native Abstraction: Modern Forms Ancient Ideas, Museum of New Mexico: Museum of Indian Arts and Culture, Santa Fe, NM, 1997.
- We are Many, We are One, University of Wisconsin–La Crosse, La Crosse, Wisconsin, 1997.
- New Art from Native America, Center Gallery, Bucknell University, Lewisburg, PA, 1997.
- Honoring Diversity: Multicultural Perspectives, Koret Gallery, Palo Alto, CA, 1997.
- I Stand in the Center of the Good, American Indian Community House Gallery, New York, NY, 1996.
- Native Streams, Jan Cicero Gallery, Chicago, Illinois, Turman Art Gallery, Indiana State University, Terre Haute, Indiana, 1996–1997.
- Living Tapestry: Contemporary Native American Artists, Laney College Art Gallery, Oakland, CA, 1995.
- Mario Martinez: Visual Interpretations of Yaqui Myths and Legends, American Indian Contemporary Arts, San Francisco, CA, 1995.
- Artists Who Are Indian, Denver Art Museum, Denver CO, 1995.
- Expressions of Spirit, Wheelwright Museum, Santa Fe, NM, 1995.
- Books by Native Artists, American Indian Community House Gallery, New York, NY, 1994–1995.
- The Submuloc Show/Columbus Wohs, ATLATL and Evergreen State College, Olympia, WA, 1992–1994.
- We are Human Beings: 27 Contemporary Native American Artists, The College of Wooster Museum, Wooster, Ohio, 1992–1993.

== Collections ==
- Smithsonian Institution's National Museum of the American Indian
- John D. and Catherine T. MacArthur Foundation, Chicago, Illinois
- Heard Museum, Phoenix, Arizona
- City of Phoenix, City Hall Collection, Phoenix, Arizona
- City of Scottsdale, City Hall Collection, Scottsdale, Arizona Rockwell Museum, Corning, New York
- Tucson Museum of Art, Tucson, Arizona
- University of Arizona, Tucson, Arizona
- Pacific Gas & Electric of California Standard Federal Bank, Burr Ridge, Illinois
- Snite Museum, University of Notre Dame, Indiana

== Grants, Awards and Special Projects ==
- Art in Embassies Program collaborative print portfolio, National Museum of the American Indian & US State Department, 2007.
- Commission: Mural, Heard Museum, Phoenix, AZ, 2003–2005.
- Native Artist in Residence Fellowship, National Museum of the American Indian, Smithsonian Museums, New York, NY, 2001–2002.
- Monothon, College of Santa Fe (now Santa Fe University of Art and Design), Santa Fe, NM, 2002.
- Heard Museum Print Workshop, Heard Museum, Phoenix, AZ, 2001.
- Lasting Impressions, print portfolio, University of Arizona, Tucson, AZ, 2001.
- Reopening the West, Rockwell Museum of Western Art, Corning, New York, 2001.
- Scottsdale/Penjamo Yaqui Mural Project, Scottsdale, AZ, 1999.
- Native Arts Research Fellowship, National Museum of the American Indian, NY, NY, awarded by ATLATL and the National Museum of the American Indian, 1998.
- Robert Rauschenberg Foundation Residency, Captiva, Florida, 2015.
- Invited Artist, Eiteljorg Contemporary Art Fellowship, Eiteljorg Museum, Indianapolis, IN, 2015.

== Bibliography ==
- New Tribe: New York/The Urban Vision Quest. Gerald McMaster, ed. Washington DC: NMAI Editions, 2005.
- The American West: People, Places and Ideas. Suzan Campbell and Kathleen Ash-Milby, Rockwell Museum of Western Art, Western Edge Press, Santa Fe, NM, 2001.
- Painting as a Language. J. Robertson and C. McDaniel, Harcourt College Publishers, 2000.
- "Abstract Visions," featured article. Southwest Art, April, 2000.
- Contemporary Native Art Calendar, 1998, Garfinkel Publications, Vancouver, BC, Canada.
- Native American Painting in the 20th Century, E. Wade, Norman: University of Oklahoma Press.
- The Telling of the Word. W.S. Penn, ed., Stewart; Tabori and Chang, New York, NY, 1996.
- Native American Art. David W. Penney and George C. Longfish, Hugh Lauter Levin Associates, 1994.
- I Stand in the Center of the Good: Interviews with Contemporary Native American Artists. Univ. of Nebraska Press, Lawrence Abbot, ed., 1994.
