= Loretta Alvarez =

Pascua Yaqui midwife

- Loretta Alvarez in 1994, age 102
- Born: Loretta Lucero; 1892/1894; Mexico
- Died: 30 December 1996 (aged 101-104); Tucson, Arizona, United States
- Citizenship: Pascua Yaqui
- Occupation: Midwife
- Known for: Tucson's Kino Community Hospital named the hospital's labor & delivery unit after her.

Loretta Lucero Alvarez (nicknamed Mama and Nana; née Lucero; 1892/1894 – 30 December 1996) was a Pascua Yaqui midwife and hitevi from the 1920s until the 1970s in Tucson, Arizona. Tucson's Kino Community Hospital named their labor and delivery unit after her.

== Personal life ==
Loretta Lucero was born in northern Mexico in 1892 or 1894. Lucero migrated from Mexico with a group of refugees when the Mexican government began deporting indigenous members of the Yoeme village. She married Luis Alvarez, a railroad worker, and moved to Nogales, Arizona. After World War I, the couple moved to Tucson, where they raised their 14 children.

== Midwifery ==
Nicknamed "Mama" by family and locals alike, she spoke both Yaqui and Spanish and provided her services to women from different ethnic groups, as well as her own Pascua Yaqui community. In her midwife work she utilized herbs and prenatal massage to deliver breech births. Lucero received payment for her work, including vegetables and food. At the Old Pascua Village, she was a traditional cook who prepared foods for the religious ceremonies. This included baptisms, weddings, and funerals. She served as a midwife until the age of 80 and attributed her long life to her Catholic faith. Along with her role as a midwife, Loretta was a Hitevi in the Pascua Yaqui community. A hitevi is a professional curer in the Yaqui community who has undergone years of training and apprenticeship. Hitevim differ as they claim to have a supernatural power called seataka that allows them to diagnose and cure diseases. Hitevim treat a broad range of patients. For example, two known patients of Loretta's were a boy with a broken kneecap and a woman who complained of swollen legs and feet. It is common for women hitevim, such as Loretta, to also practice Midwifery.

== Legacy ==
Tucson's Kino Community Hospital named their labor and delivery unit after Lucero.
