= Courtesy resolution =

Courtesy resolution is a non-controversial resolution in the nature of congratulations on the birth of a child, celebration of a wedding anniversary, congratulations of an outstanding citizen achievement or a similar event. It is "a resolution expressing thanks for assistance or commending meritorious accomplishments." An example of a courtesy resolution is the resolution at the end of the political convention thanking everyone for their time.

For a Courtesy Resolution, only the affirmative vote is taken and this is usually a voice vote.
