= Yaqui River =

River in the state of Sonora in northwestern Mexico

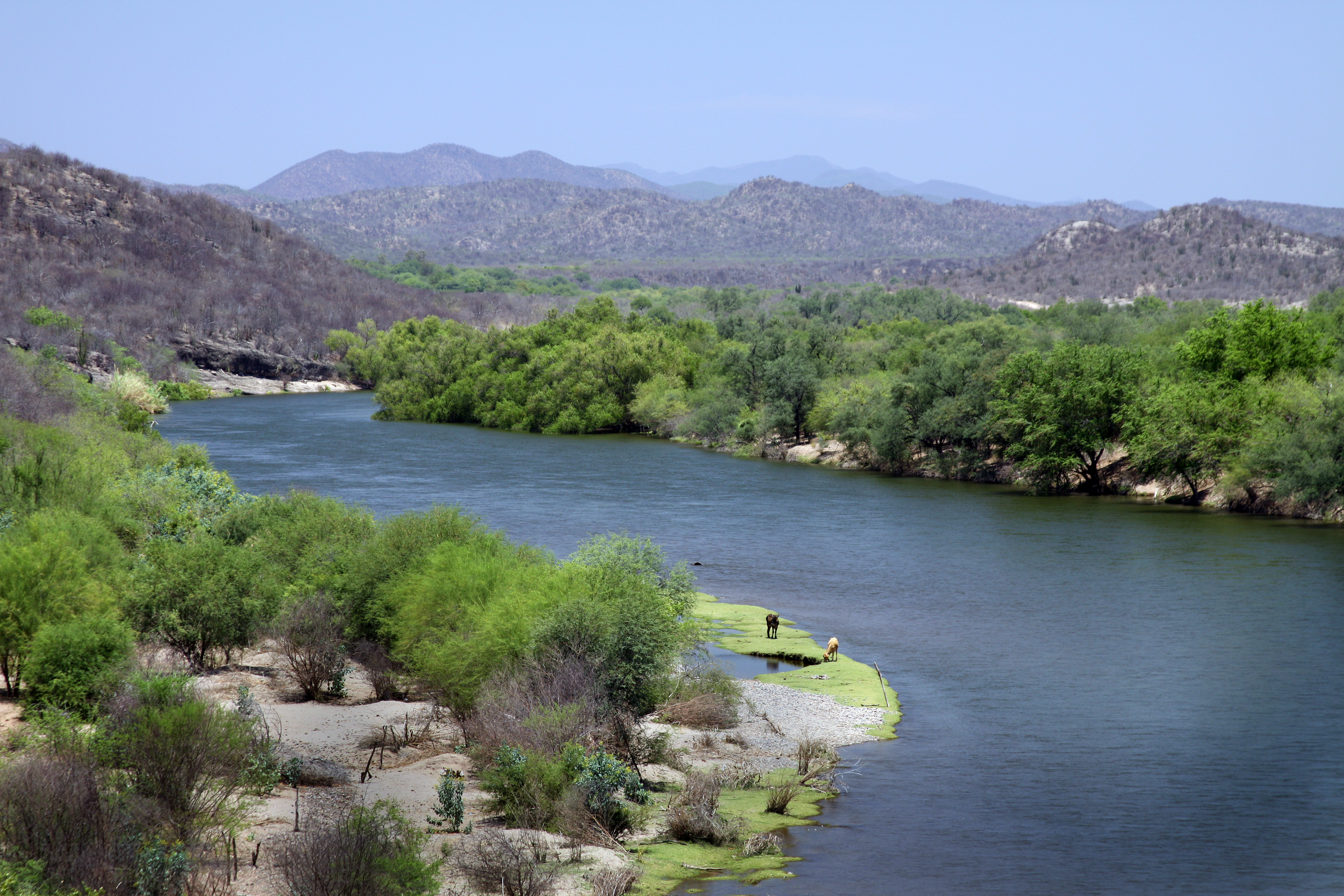
- Yaqui River - Sonora, Mexico

- Location of mouth
- Native name: Río Yaqui (Spanish)

Location
- Country: Mexico
- State: Sonora

Physical characteristics
- Source
  - location: Sierra Madre Occidental
  - coordinates: 29.529887°N 109.228377°W
- Mouth
  - location: Gulf of California
  - coordinates: 27.6673°N 110.6120°W
- Length: 320 km (200 mi)

The Yaqui River (Río Yaqui in Spanish) (Hiak Vatwe in the Yaqui or Yoreme language) is a river in the state of Sonora in northwestern Mexico. It was formerly known as the Rio del Norte. Being the largest river system in the state of Sonora, the Yaqui river is used for irrigation, especially in the Valle del Yaqui.

The Rio Yaqui originates in the Sierra Madre Occidental at the junction of the Rio Bavispe and the Rio Aros at Lat. 29.529887 Long. −109.228377. It is approximately 320 km (200 mi) in length, and flows south and southwest into the Gulf of California near the city of Obregon.

Its course is interrupted by several reservoirs like Plutarco Elías Calles (El Novillo), Lázaro Cárdenas (Angostura), or Álvaro Obregón (El Oviáchic, Lake Ouiachic), which provides the water resource for the intensively irrigated region of Ciudad Obregón.

== Human history ==
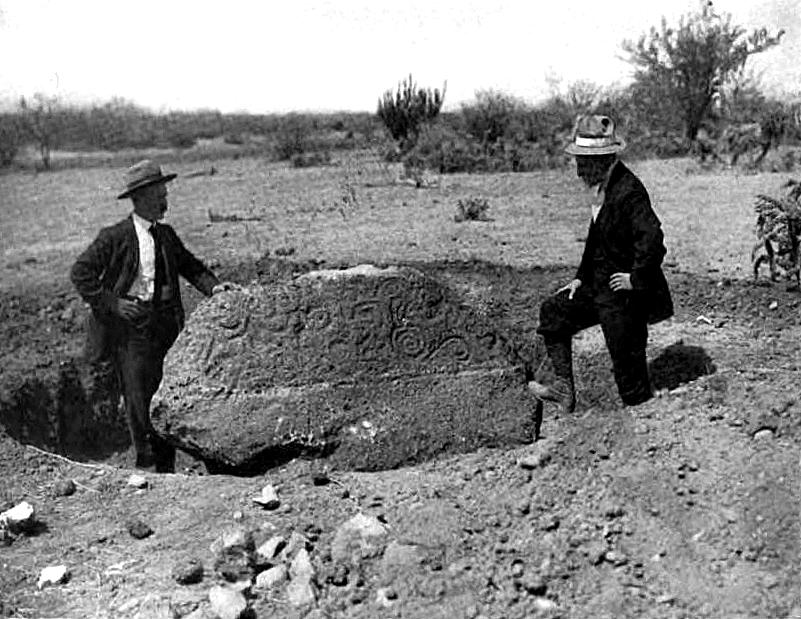
The Esperanza Stone. Found by Major Frederick Russell Burnham in the Yaqui Valley in 1908. Burnham left; Holder, right

As early as the 6th century AD, native inhabitants known as the Yoeme or Yaqui were living in family groups along the Rio Yaqui. The Yaqui used simple irrigation techniques to cultivate corn, beans, and squash while also hunting local game and gathering wild foods from the area. Yaquis traded native foods, furs, shells, salt, and other goods with many indigenous groups of central North America. The Yaquis lived more or less independently until the late 19th century, when many of them were driven from their lands surrounding the Rio Yaqui by the Mexican Army and forced to flee to more remote areas. Many Yaquis left the Rio Yaqui area to fight in the Vakatetteve Mountains, while others relocated to Yaqui communities in Arizona. By the late 1880s, warfare with the Mexican Army had killed off many members of the Yaqui tribe, so that only 4,000 Yaquis remained in the Rio Yaqui area.

In the early 20th century, after a series of conflicts with the Mexican Army, many of the remaining Yaqui were arrested and dispersed to plantations in the Yucatán Peninsula. The survivors continued resisting until the late 1920s, when Mexican authorities overcame resistance by employing heavy artillery and aircraft to bomb and shell Yaqui villages.

Also in the early 20th century, Major Frederick Russell Burnham, a celebrated American scout, went to Mexico in search of mineral resources. While there he met the naturalist Dr. Charles Frederick Holder and the two men soon became associated with the early Yaqui River irrigation project. Burnham reasoned that a dam could provide year-round water to rich alluvial soil in the valley; turning the region into one of the garden spots of the world and generate much needed electricity. He purchased water rights and some 300 acres (1.2 km^{2}) of land in this region and contacted an old friend from Africa, John Hays Hammond, who conducted his own studies and then purchased an additional 900,000 acres (3,600 km^{2}) of this land—an area the size of Rhode Island. He became a close business associate of Hammond and led a team of 500 men in guarding mining properties owned by Hammond, J.P. Morgan, and the Guggenheims in the state of Sonora.

As the irrigation and mining projects were nearing completion in 1912, the onset of the Mexican Revolution frustrated their plans. The final blow to these efforts came in 1917 when Mexico passed laws prohibiting the sale of land to foreigners. Burnham and Hammond carried their properties until 1930 and then sold them to the Mexican government. In his case study of Burnham's American colonization scheme, Professor Bradford concluded: "a combination of Indian problems, the intricacies of the developing Mexican revolutionary process, and a less than clear-cut mandate from Washington, DC, served to bring the colony down."

Burnham, together with Holder, made archeological discoveries of what he believed to be remnants of Maya civilization in the region, including the Esperanza Stone.

== Ecology ==
The Rio Yaqui was once home to the American crocodile (Crocodylus acutus) and represented one of the northernmost natural locations for the species. Decades of environmental degradation in the region led to the extirpation of the species from the region. This was nearly the southern extent for the Mexican grizzly bear.

The Mexican native trout or Yaqui trout and 34 other species of fish remains.

== See also ==
- List of longest rivers of Mexico

== Bibliography ==
- Bradford, Richard H. (May 1988). "John Hays Hammond: For God and Yale in Mexico". The Journal of Southern History. Southern Historical Meeting. The Fifty-Third Annual Meeting. 54 (2). JSTOR 2209400.
- DeBano, Leonard F. (1999). Biodiversity and the Management of the Madrean Archipelago: The Sky Islands of Southwestern United States and Northwestern Mexico. DIANE Publishing. ISBN 9780788183867.
- Ensayo, Rudo (1764). A Description of Sonora and Arizona. University of Arizona Press.
- Fort, Charles (1919). The Book of the Damned. Horace Liveright. chap. XI. ISBN 978-1-870870-53-5.
- Hammond, John Hays (1935). The Autobiography of John Hays Hammond. New York: Farrar & Rinehart. ISBN 978-0-405-05913-1.
- "Guarding Morgan Mines: Burnham's Force also at Guggenheim Properties is report" (PDF). The New York Times. April 23, 1912. ISSN 0362-4331.
- Holder, Charles (1910). "The Esperanza Stone". Scientific American. 103 (11): 196. doi:10.1038/scientificamerican09101910-196.
