= Pascua Yaqui Tribe =

Yaqui Native American tribe in Arizona

- Indian reservation
- Flag of the Pascua Yaqui Tribe of Arizona

- Location of the Pascua Yaqui Reservation in Pima County Arizona.
- Country: United States
- State: Arizona

Government
  - Type: Tribe
  - Body: Tribal Council
  - Chairman: Julian Hernandez
- Demonym: Yaqui

The Pascua Yaqui Tribe of Arizona is a federally recognized tribe of Yaqui Native Americans in the state of Arizona.

Descended from the Yaqui people whose original homelands include the Yaqui River valley in western Sonora, Mexico and southern Arizona, the Pascua Yaqui Tribe sought refuge from the Mexican government en masse prior to the Mexican Revolution (1910–1920). The United States subsequently recognized lands that were part of Yaqui territories near Nogales and south Tucson. In the early 20th century, the tribe began to return to settlements south of Tucson in an area they named Pascua Village, and in Guadalupe, near Tempe. They gained recognition by the United States government on September 18, 1978.

== History ==
In ancient times, Yaquis were living in family groups along the Yaqui River (Yoem Vatwe) north to the Gila River, where they gathered wild desert foods, hunted game, and cultivated corn, beans, and squash. Yaquis traded local foods, furs, shells, salt, and other goods with many indigenous groups. Yaquis traveled extensively in pre-Columbian times and sometimes settled among other Native groups like the Zuni. The Yaqui peoples homelands consisted of several towns in the Yaqui River delta near the Sea of Cortez in Sonora, Mexico. The Jesuits established missions here among the Yaqui by the 19th century. A syncretic Catholic-Native religion developed where Yaquis incorporated Catholic rituals, saints, and teachings into their existing indigenous worldview. After contact with non-Natives after the Spanish arrival in the 1500s, the Yaquis came into an almost constant conflict with Spanish colonists and the later Mexican republic, a period known as the Yaqui Wars, which ended in 1929. The 400 years of wars with the occupiers sent many Yaquis north from Mexico back into Arizona, and the southwestern United States.

The Pascua Yaquis and other Yaquis in Arizona descend from refugees who fled Mexico between 1887 and 1910. During these years the Mexican government attempted to destroy the Yaqui Nation, via warfare, occupation, and forced deportation of Yaquis to virtual slavery in the Yucatán. Yaqui refugees established Yaqui barrios at Pacua and Barrio Libre in Tucson, at Marana, and at Guadalupe and Scottsdale near Phoenix. By the 1940s there were approximately 2,500 Yaquis in Arizona. Most worked as migrant farm laborers. This seasonal work melded well with the off-season when Yaquis would plan and carry out complex religious ceremonials that took months to complete. In Arizona, the Yaqui communities re-established traditional ceremonies, most importantly, the Lenten ceremonies that reenact the passion and resurrection of Jesus Christ. The Pascua community is named after "Pascua," Easter in Spanish. The various Yaqui communities established modest Catholic churches. At Pascua the church was named San Ignacio de Loyola. The Easter ceremonies featured the Yaqui deer dancer, the most enduring symbol of the Yaquis in America. The Pascua Yaquis maintained other aspects of the syncretic Jesuit-Yaqui religious traditions and offices as well.

After fleeing to Arizona, most Yaquis lived in dire poverty, squatting on open lands most often near railroad lines. In 1923, a retired teacher and humanitarian, Thamar Richey, successfully lobbied Tucson to establish a public school for Yaqui children. A realtor donated land for a new subdivision named Barrio Pascua near downtown. This community became a center of Yaqui life in Arizona. During the Great Depression of the 1930s, there was an effort to deport the foreign-national Yaquis back to Mexico. This effort failed largely because the State Department determined their safety could not be ensured. To protect the Yaquis, Thamar Richey in 1935 established a civic-minded committee that included University of Arizona President H.L. Shantz, Anthropology Professor Edward Holland Spicer, and Arizona's first congresswoman Isabella Greenway. Spicer, whose work on the Pascua Yaquis would establish him as one of the nation's leading anthropologists, and the others contacted the Bureau of Indian Affairs to aid the group. Issues of their Mexican origins clouded this effort. As this was during the landmark Indian New Deal when Commissioner of Indian Affairs John Collier was attempting to aid indigenous groups that for decades had faced federal assaults on their lands and cultures, at one point he offered a solution: the Yaquis could relocate to the Colorado River Reservation in far western Arizona. Ultimately this plan failed because of finances and nationality questions.

After World War II, a Yaqui veteran, Anselmo Valencia, returned to Pascua vowing to improve life for his people. He came home determined to fight for his people's rights as American citizens and indigenous Americans. He became head of the religious caballeros society. In 1955, Valencia established the San Ignacio Club to work for community betterment at Pascua. Around this time a University of Arizona anthropology student, Muriel Thayer Painter, began to study the Pascua Yaquis, vowing to aid the struggling group. Residents of Pascua increasingly had lost their lots to tax foreclosures and other economic issues. A study found that most homes had no running water, indoor plumbing, or electricity. Valencia, Spicer, and Painter established the Committee for Pascua Community Housing in the early 1960s to improve housing conditions in the neighborhood. In 1962 while collecting wild herbs in the desert southwest of Tucson, Valencia had a vision that his people would one day relocate there. To accomplish this, Valencia, Spicer, and Geronimo Estrella spearheaded the creation of the Pascua Yaqui Land Development Project, with membership that included Yaquis Felipa Suarez, Gloria Suarez, Joaquina Garcia, and Raul Silvas. The group contacted Congressman Mo Udall for federal help in 1962.

At the urging of Ned Spicer, in 1962 the Yaquis formed the Pascua Yaqui Association (PYA) as a non-profit corporation to receive funds and to deal with federal officials. The PYA evolved into the modern Pascua Yaqui tribal government. The PYA was a quasi-tribal government that worked with Congressman Mo Udall to prepare legislation to transfer federal land for the new Yaqui community Valencia had envisioned on the outskirts of Tucson. Because so many members of Congress were opposed to establishing a new tribal-federal relationship with the Yaquis during the "Termination Era" that lasted until the 1960s, language was inserted in the land transfer bill that prohibited the Pascua Yaqui from being eligible for Bureau of Indian Affair's services or benefits that flowed from tribal acknowledgment.

=== Federal recognition and reservation land ===
In 1964, Congressman Morris K. Udall introduced a bill in Congress for the transfer to the Tribe of 202 acres (0.82 km^{2}) southwest of Tucson. The bill was approved in August 1964 and the Pascua Yaqui Association received the deed for the 220 acres (89 ha) of Bureau of Land Management land. To build a new community at the desert site, Spicer suggested establishing a Community Action Program under the new Office of Economic Opportunity, established as part of President Lyndon Johnson's War on Poverty. Its programs required community participation, and Valencia and Spicer led the federally-funded effort to establish a tribal base at New Pascua. With federal moneys that totaled over $400,000, Pascua Yaquis built roads (named for historic Yaqui communities in Mexico and cultural heroes), installed utilities, and built tribal community buildings. In 1965, about 370 Yaquis still lived in Barrio Pascua, now being called "Old Pascua." In the early 1970s, a younger Yaqui, M. Raymond Ybarra, a protege of Anselmo Valencia, increasingly took leadership roles at New Pascua. In 1975 they asked Congressman Udall to introduce a bill to federally recognize the Pascua Yaquis as a tribe. Opposition over their Mexican origins and from other Arizona Yaqui communities stymied this effort. In early 1977, Raymond Ybarra and Anselmo Valencia, representing the Pascua Yaqui Association, met with US Senator Dennis DeConcini (D-AZ) to urge him to introduce legislation to provide complete federal recognition of the Yaqui people living on the property conveyed to the Pascua Yaqui Association by the United States through the Act of October 8, 1964. (78 Stat. 1197). Senator DeConcini introduced S.1633 on June 7, 1977. After extensive hearings and consideration, it was passed by the Senate on April 5, 1978. It was accepted by the Conference Committee with the House of Representatives and the Conference Report was passed by the Senate. It became public law, PL 95-375, on September 18, 1978. The law provides for all federal services and benefits including those provided by the Bureau of Indian Affairs and the Indian Health Service. It gives the tribe powers of self-government, with Reservation status for Yaqui lands.

The Pascua Yaqui Tribe of Arizona received designation as a historical tribe in 1994. In 1988 the Tribe's first constitution was approved. The Pascua Yaqui Reservation (32°06′56″N 110°04′48″W) is located in Pima County, in the southwestern part of the Tucson metropolitan area, amidst the suburban communities of Drexel Heights and Valencia West, and adjacent to the eastern section of the Tohono O'odham Indian Reservation, known as the San Xavier Indian Reservation. It has a land area of 4.832 km^{2} (1.8657 sq mi, or 1,194 acres), and a 2000 census resident population of 3,315 persons, over 90 percent of whom are Native Americans. The community is governed by a chairman, a vice chairman and nine tribal council members. Police protection is provided by the Tribal Police Department, and fire protection is provided by full-time firefighters and reserves.

== Religion ==
Though many members of the tribe adhere to Christian teachings, predominantly Catholicism, the culture of the Pascua Yaqui has preserved a rich legacy of native cultural elements that have survived the influence of missionaries. The Tribe has accepted political integration into American society but continues to retain much of their former religious and cultural ways of life.

The Yaqui people have a rich oral history related to their past and worldview that is passed down from one generation to the next.

Complexities occur for the preservation of Yaqui religious tradition considering that the Yaqui people are divided by an international boundary. Frequent trips are made across the U.S.-Mexico border to and from for family members and cultural participants to contribute to the ceremonies both in the United States and in Mexico.

== Economy ==
The Tribal government is the largest employer on the reservation. In addition to a smoke shop and artisan shop, the Tribe operates the Casino of the Sun gaming facility, which includes slot machines, bingo, restaurants, games and employs more than 600 staff. Casino Del Sol, the Tribe's second gaming property, opened October 2001 and has provided an additional 550+ jobs on the reservation and in the Tucson Community. The expansion of Casino Del Sol opened November 11, 2011. An additional 700 jobs were provided to the community with the expansion.

== Government ==
A tribal council is made up of eleven elected officials, dedicated to the well-being and advancement of their tribe as a whole.

The Yaqui Tribal Council of 2024-2028: Julian Hernandez, chairman; Peter Yucupicio, Vice-chairman, Thomas Cupis, Treasurer; Rosa Soto Alvarez, Secretary; Rolando Flores, Council Member; Herminia Frias, Council Member; Andrea Gonzalez, Council Member; Gloria Alvarez Gomez, Council member; Francisco Munoz, Council Member; Irene Sanchez, Council Member; Jose-Enrique Saldana, Council Member.

The Yaqui Tribal Council 2020–2024: Peter Yucupicio, chairman; Robert Valencia, Vice-chairman; Mary Jane Buenamea, Secretary; Raymundo Baltazar, Treasurer; Antonia Campoy, Council Member; Francisco Munoz, Council Member; Francisco Valencia Council Member; Herminia Frias, Council Member; David Ramirez, Council Member; Rosa Soto Alvarez, Council Member; Cruzita Armenta, Council Member.

The Yaqui Tribal Council of 2012-2016: Peter Yucupicio Chairman, Catalina Alvarez Vice-chairwoman, Francisco Munoz Treasurer, John Escalante Council Member, Marcelino Flores Council Member, Robert Valencia Council Member, Raymond Buelna Council Member, David Ramirez Council Member, Mary Jane Buenamea Council Member, Rosa Soto Alvarez Council Member, Cruzita Armenta Council Member.

The Pascua Yaquis have a status similar to other Native American tribes of the United States. This status makes the Yaqui eligible for specific services due to trust responsibility that the United States offers Native American peoples who have suffered land loss.

A U.S. government assisted news letter, Yaqui Times, also helps in keeping the people of the Pascua Yaqui Tribe informed.

Blood quantum for membership in the Pascua Yaqui Tribe is at least one quarter Yaqui blood. The Pascua Yaqui legal system gives no allowance in quantum for other tribal blood.

== Court system ==
The Pascua Yaqui Tribe operates a Judicial Department with both trial courts and an appellate court. Criminal cases are prosecuted by a Prosecutor's Office. Representation for indigent individuals is available through the Public Defender's Office. The Tribe is represented by the Attorney General's Office. All of these functions and a tribal police department are located in a modern Multi-Purpose Justice Center, which was opened in 2012.

=== 2013 Violence Against Women Act Pilot Project ===
Since the Supreme Court's majority opinion in Oliphant v. Suquamish Indian Tribe, the tribal courts were forbidden to try a non-Indian, unless specifically authorized by the Congress. The passage of the Violence Against Women Reauthorization Act of 2013 (VAWA 2013) signed into law on March 7, 2013, by President Barack Obama authorized the tribal courts to try a non-Indian who is charged with domestic violence towards a Native American. This was motivated by the high percentage of Native American women being assaulted by non-Indian men, feeling immune by the lack of jurisdiction of Tribal Courts upon them. This new law generally takes effect on March 7, 2015, but also authorizes a voluntary "Pilot Project" to allow certain tribes to begin exercising special jurisdiction sooner. On February 6, 2014, three tribes were selected for this Pilot Project: the Pascua Yaqui Tribe (Arizona), the Tulalip Tribes of Washington, and the Confederated Tribes of the Umatilla Indian Reservation (Oregon).

== Education ==
On July 23, 2008, the Pascua Yaqui Education Department was created under the Pascua Yaqui Education Ordinance of 2008 for the purpose and mission of promoting education for tribal members. As of 2026, the Pascua Yaqui Tribe offers many in-house opportunities for education including Pre-K-12 education, higher education assistance, adult education, the Dr. Escalante Tribal Library, and the Huya Miisim Microcampus in partnership with the University of Arizona.

Elementary education west of the longitude 111° 5'18.74"W is served by Vesey Elementary School with the rest of the reservation served by Harriet Johnson Primary School and Anna E. Lawrence Intermediate School. The entire reservation is served by Valencia Middle School and Cholla High School for middle and secondary education, respectively. All schools are part of the Tucson Unified School District.

== Notable tribal members ==
- Loretta Alvarez, midwife
- Mario Martinez, painter living in New York
- Merced Maldonado, mask maker and pascola dancer
- Pilar Thomas, lawyer and former government official.
- Brian Garcia, member of the Arizona House of Representatives.
- Herminia Frias, youngest person and first female tribal member to become Chair of the Pascua Yaqui Indian Tribe.
- Carlos Gonzales (MD, FAAFP), physician of Family Medicine, 5th generation Arizonan and student mentor at the University of Arizona College of Medicine. Assistant Dean of Curricular Affairs, Associate Professor of Family and Community Medicine (Clinical Scholar Track), Director of Rural Health Professions Program. He is the Director/Creator of the Commitment to Underserved People Program (1996), a medical student-run clinic at UACOM-Tucson which helps address clinical needs to local underserved and resource-poor populations. He also founded the annual Native American blessing tradition at UACOM-Tucson, a ceremony in which he performs a prayer to the "Seven Sacred Directions" to cleanse and honor medical students as well as the individuals who donated their bodies for the students' education.
