= Texas Hill Station =

Butterfield Overland Mail stagecoach stop in Arizona

- Locale
- Location within Arizona Location within the United States
- Coordinates: 32°49′50″N 113°39′33″W
- Country: United States
- State: Arizona
- County: Yuma
- Elevation: 337 ft (103 m)
- Time zone: UTC-7 (MST (no DST))

Texas Hill Station is a site of a later Butterfield Overland Mail stagecoach station, in Arizona, United States. It was one of several built in 1859 to increase the number of water stops and team changes along the drier and hotter sections of the route and was located about 2 miles east of Texas Hill.

== History ==
Texas Hill Station replaced Griswell's Station and when the Union Army measured the distances between stations in 1862, it was located 10.98 miles east of Mohawk Station, and 16.13 miles from Flap-Jack Ranch, later known as Grinnel’s Ranch, and Stanwix Station. Their report also noted the station was a half a mile back from the river and that there was a little grass on the hill.

From 1861 the station was abandoned by the Overland Mail Company, but Texas Hill Station remained in use as a water stop and camp for soldiers, freighters and travelers, and from 1866 until 1880 a stage station once again.

== The site today ==
Today no trace of the station remains in the river valley, no doubt swept away by the changing course of the river or by flood events since 1880.
