= Filibusters Camp =

Butterfield Overland Mail stagecoach stop in Arizona

- Locale
- Filibusters Camp
- Location within Arizona Location within the United States
- Coordinates: 32°40′50″N 114°3′23″W
- Country: United States
- State: Arizona
- County: Yuma
- Elevation: 305 ft (93 m)
- Time zone: UTC-7 (MST (no DST))

Filibuster Camp is the historic locale of a camp along the Gila River route of the Southern Emigrant Trail in Yuma County, Arizona, named in memory of a failed filibuster expedition to Sonora that began there in 1856.

== History ==
=== Filibuster Camp ===
Filibuster Camp acquired the name because it was the site from which Henry A. Crabb led an 1856 Crabb Invasion expedition into Sonora, Mexico, to try to take over the state of Sonora. At the time Crabb was suspected of trying to conquer Sonora like the filibuster William Walker had done only a few years prior. Crabb's venture resulted in the death of all but one or two of the expedition and the beheading of Crabb. Its former site is located just north of Old Highway 80 on the east side of S Ave 34 East, east of Wellton, Arizona on Wellton Mesa, Yuma County, Arizona.

=== Filibuster Camp Station ===
One of the original Butterfield Overland Mail stage stations, Filibuster Camp Station was located nearby the old camp at 32°41′8.18″N 114°05′57.61″W. The site then served as a station in 1858 and 1859. It was 18 miles east of Swiveler's Station, 19 miles west of Peterman's Station.

Antelope Peak Station, a later station located 15.14 miles east of the new Mission Camp Station, 12.83 miles to Mohawk Station, at the foot of Antelope Peak. It replaced Filibusters Camp Camp Station, 9.14 miles to the west. Filibusters Camp Station 6 miles from Mission Camp was replaced because Antelope Hill Station had a better water supply. The addition of these new stations decreased the distance between water stops and team changes in this desert region, something the company was also doing elsewhere in New Mexico Territory, California and Texas.
