= Antelope Peak Station =

Butterfield Overland Mail stagecoach stop in Arizona

- Locale
- Location within Arizona
- Coordinates: 32°42′47″N 114°00′54″W
- Country: United States
- State: Arizona
- County: Yuma
- Founded: 1859
- Abandoned: 1879

Population
  - Total: 0
- Time zone: UTC-7 (MST (no DST))

Antelope Peak Station, a later Butterfield Overland Mail station located 15.14 miles east of Mission Camp, at the foot of Antelope Peak. It replaced Filibusters Camp Station, 6 miles to the west. The Overland Mail Company replaced Filibusters Camp, because Antelope Peak Station had a better water supply. Its location is thought to be 32°42′47″N 114°00′54″W. The station was built by John Kilbride in 1857 but did not appear on the stagecoach itinerary until 1859.

Before the Butterfeild Line, in 1857, Antelope Peak was nearby the location of one of the water and camp sites of the San Antonio–San Diego Mail Line between its stations at Maricopa Wells and Jaeger City, California, location of Fort Yuma Station, which was also the site of the ferry across the Colorado River just down river from Fort Yuma. Antelope Peak Station was 20 miles west of Peterman's Station and 24 miles east of Little Corral, 40 miles east of Jaeger City. Given the proximity to grass near the mountain referred to below and the Gila River nearby it made a good overnight camp.

In 1862 Union Army recorded the distances from Antelope Peak as 9.1 miles from Filibuster Camp, 12.8 miles to Mohawk Station. Also:

Grass within three-quarters of a mile of Antelope Peak. The camp is at the station; no grass.

Antelope Peak Station was abandoned like other stations on its route by the Overland Mail Company just before the American Civil War began in March 1861. It appears to have been in use as a military hay station in 1863 through to at least 1877. Some adobe buildings and a corral probably belonging to the station were still standing in 1923. There is now nothing left of the installation due to later railroad and road developments.
