= STN =

STN may refer to:

== Broadcasting ==
- Score Television Network, a Canadian specialty channel
- Shalimar Television Network, a Pakistani television network
- Student Television Network, in the US

== Organizations ==
- Stantec, a Canadian architectural and engineering consulting firm
- STN International, an information service
- Szczecin Scientific Society (Polish: Szczecińskie Towarzystwo Naukowe), a Polish learned society

== Science and technology ==
- State transition network, a diagram
- Subthalamic nucleus, a subcortical structure in the brain
- Super-twisted nematic display, a type of liquid crystal display

== Transport ==
- London Stansted Airport (IATA airport code), England
- Stanley station (North Dakota) (Station code), an Amtrak station, US
- Stonehaven railway station (Station code), Scotland

== Other uses ==
- Owa language (ISO 639-3 code)
- São Tomé and Príncipe dobra (Currency code), a currency
- Schaghticoke Tribal Nation, North America

== See also ==
- Public switched telephone network (PSTN)
- Station (disambiguation)
