= Griswell =

Griswell may refer to:

- Griswell's Station, also known as Griswell's, a stagecoach station in Arizona
- J. Barry Griswell, American businessman
