= Texas Hill =

Texas Hill may mean:

== A summit or ridge ==
=== Arizona ===
- Texas Hill (Arizona) a summit in Yuma County, Arizona

=== California ===
- Texas Hill (El Dorado County, California) a Ridge
- Texas Hill (Mariposa County, California) a Summit
- Texas Hill (Placer County, California) a Summit
- Texas Hill (San Bernardino County, California) a Summit
- Texas Hill (Yuba County, California) a Summit

=== Florida ===
- Texas Hill (Jefferson County, Florida) a Summit

=== New Mexico ===
- Texas Hill (Eddy County, New Mexico) a Summit

=== New York ===
- Texas Hill (Columbia County, New York) a Summit
- Texas Hill (Madison County, New York) a Summit

=== Utah ===
- Texas Hill (Wayne County, Utah) a Summit

=== Vermont ===
- Texas Hill (Chittenden County, Vermont) a Summit
