= Antelope Hill, Arizona =

Summit in Arizona

Coordinates: 32°42′14″N 114°00′57″W

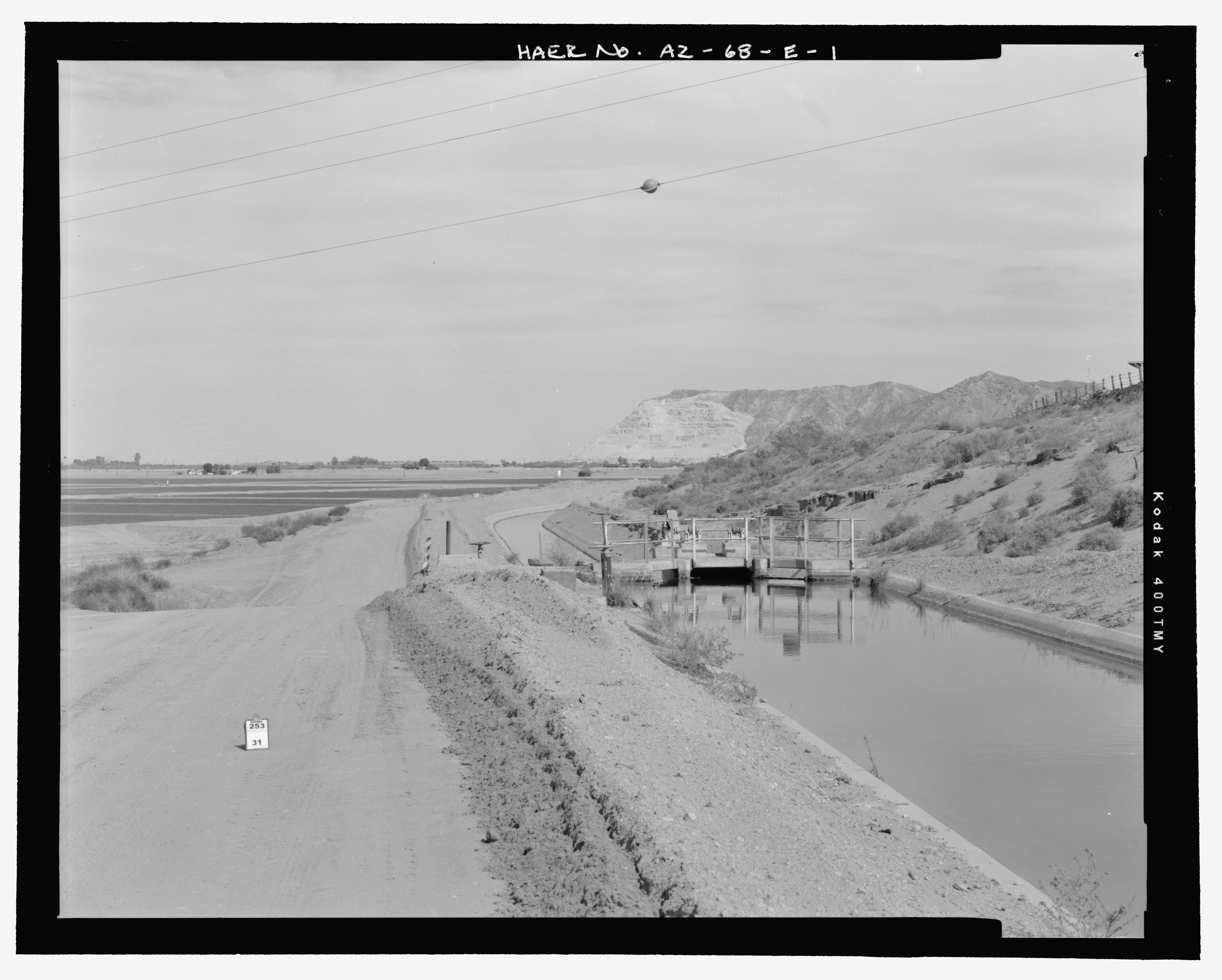
The north end of Antelope Hill, adjacent the Gila River in the Lower Gila River Valley.

Antelope Hill, formerly Antelope Peak, is a summit, at an elevation of 804 feet, near the Gila River in Yuma County, Arizona.

Antelope Peak was a landmark for travelers on the trails and roads along the course of the Gila River in previous centuries. It was a location of a camp and watering place on the Southern Emigrant Trail, it was nearby the site of the Butterfield Overland Mail, Antelope Peak Station, a later stagecoach station located 15.14 miles east of Mission Camp, which replaced its older Filibusters Camp stage station.
