= The Station =

The Station may refer to:

== Arts and entertainment ==
- The Station (1990 film) (La stazione), an Italian comedy-drama film
- The Station (2013 film), or Blood Glacier, an Austrian horror film
- The Station (video game), a 2018 science fiction game
- "The Station" (song), a 2018 song by Oneohtrix Point Never
- The Station, a Swedish video game developer acquired by Thunderful Group

== Structures ==
- The Station, Hedon, a historic public house in the East Riding of Yorkshire, England
- The Station, Rolleston, a planned shopping centre in Rolleston, New Zealand
- The Station, Stoneleigh, a historic public house in Stoneleigh, Surrey, England
- The Station nightclub fire, the fourth-deadliest nightclub fire in U.S. history, in Rhode Island

== See also ==
- Station (disambiguation)
