= Station =

Station may refer to:

== Agriculture ==
- Station (Australian agriculture), a large Australian landholding used for livestock production
- Station (New Zealand agriculture), a large New Zealand farm used for grazing by sheep and cattle
  - Cattle station, a cattle-rearing station in Australia or New Zealand
  - Sheep station, a sheep-rearing station in Australia or New Zealand

== Communications ==
- Radio communication station, a radio frequency communication station of any kind, including audio, TV, and non-broadcast uses
  - Radio broadcasting station, an audio station intended for reception by the general public
  - Amateur radio station, a station operating on frequencies allocated for ham or other non-commercial use
  - Broadcast relay station
  - Ground station (or Earth station), a terrestrial radio station for extraplanetary telecommunication with satellites or spacecraft
  - Television station
- Courier station, a relay station in a courier system
  - Station of the cursus publicus, a state-run courier system of the Roman Empire
- Station (networking), a device capable of using the IEEE 802.11 networking protocol
- Google Station, a public WiFi service

== Geography ==
- Gauging station, or stream gauge, a location along a river or stream used for gauging or other measurements
- Hill station, a town which is high enough to be relatively cool in summer, mostly in colonial Asia and Africa

== Infrastructure ==
- Charging station, a device or location that supplies electric energy for recharging electric vehicles
- Filling station, a facility for refilling a vehicle with liquid fuel
- Fire station or firehouse, a base for firefighters
- Police station, a base for police officers
- Research station, an often remote place where scientific research is conducted
- Weather station. a place where meteorological readings are taken

== Military and government ==
- Diplomatic mission or station, where a diplomatic/consular official (or mission) is posted
- Military base
- Naval air station, an airbase of the United States Navy
- Royal Air Force station
- Royal Naval Air Station
- Station (frontier defensive structure)

== Music, film, and entertainment ==
- Station (album), by the band Russian Circles
- Station (1981 film), a Japanese film directed by Yasuo Furuhata
- Station (2014 film), a Hindi thriller released in India
- Station (TV series), an Armenian TV series
- Station.com, a game portal operated by Sony Online Entertainment
- Stations (film), a 1983 Canadian film directed by William D. MacGillivray
- Stations (novel), a 2026 novel by Louise Kennedy
- SM Station, a South Korean digital music channel operated by S.M. Entertainment
- Station, a fictional alien character in the 1991 film Bill & Ted's Bogus Journey
- "Station", a song from the album Shame, Shame by Dr. Dog
- "Stations", a song from the album Churn by the band Shihad

== Places ==
- Station, California, former name of Laws, California
- Station, California, former name of Zurich, California
- La Station, a community centre in Montreal, originally designed by Ludwig Mies van der Rohe

== Transport ==
- Bus station
- Metro station or subway station, a transit rail station
- Station (roller coaster), the place guests load a roller coaster train
- Train order station, a control point at which trains can be stopped and controlled
- Train station, also known as railway station or railroad station
- Tram stop, a tram, streetcar, or light rail station

== Other uses ==
- Station, one of the four bases on a baseball field
- Station, a term for social status or official rank, based on one's position and prestige in society
- Station, in childbirth, the position of the baby in the birth canal
- Stations of the Cross, in Western Christian churches, a series of depictions of Jesus on the day of his crucifixion

== See also ==
- Service station (disambiguation)
- Station to Station (disambiguation)
- The Station (disambiguation)
- Depot (disambiguation)
