= Ruby, Arizona =

- Ghost town
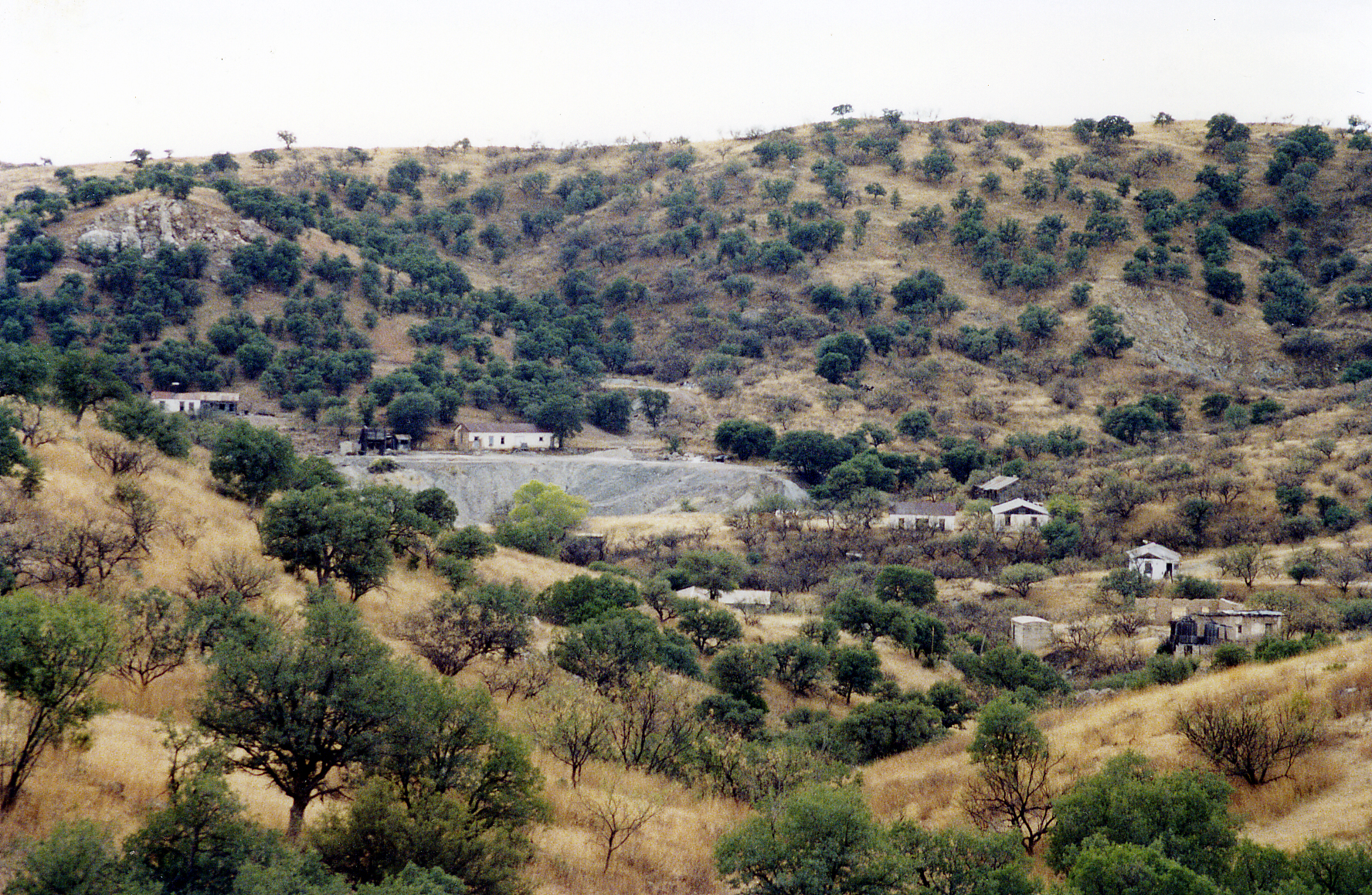
- Ruby, Arizona in 1990

- Location within Arizona Location within the United States
- Coordinates: 31°27′40″N 111°14′15″W
- Country: United States
- State: Arizona
- County: Santa Cruz
- Elevation: 4,186 ft (1,276 m)
- Time zone: UTC-7 (MST (no DST))
- Post office opened: April 11, 1912
- Post office closed: May 31, 1941

Ruby is a ghost town in Santa Cruz County, Arizona, United States. It is situated near the base of Montana Peak in the Pajarita Wilderness, roughly 25 miles west of Rio Rico, and 7 miles north of the Mexico–United States border. Originally named Montana Camp, the town was founded in 1877 as a mining camp.

Several important historical events took place in and around Ruby, including the Bear Valley raid in April 1886, the Battle of Bear Valley in January 1918, and the Ruby Murders between 1920 and 1922.

== History ==
The first recorded claim for the Montana mine was in 1877. A small mining camp, initially named Montana Camp, was founded. From 1877 to 1912, the Montana mine produced mostly gold and silver, and the population during that period never exceeded 50 people. On 11 April 1912, the mining camp's general store owner Julius Andrews established the post office. Andrews named the post office "Ruby", after his wife, Lille B. Ruby Andrews, and the mining camp soon became known as Ruby.

Between 1920 and 1922, the town of Ruby and the surroundings were the scene of three double homicides known as the Ruby Murders, which led to the largest manhunt in the history of the Southwestern United States, which included the first airplane ever used in an Arizona manhunt.

The most prosperous period for Ruby was in the late 1920s and 1930s, when the Eagle-Picher Lead Company operated the mine and upgraded the camp. During that period, the Montana mine was among Arizona's leading producers of zinc, lead, and silver.

At its peak in the mid-1930s, Ruby had a population of about 1,200. The mine closed in 1940, the post office closed on 31 May 1941, and the town was abandoned by the end of 1941.

Along with Vulture City, Ruby is one of the best-preserved ghost towns in Arizona. It consists of approximately 25 buildings (including some homes, the jail, and the school), the playground, mining machinery, and several abandoned mines. Public tours were offered from 1994 until 2024. The town is on private property, and there is currently no public access to the site.

== Gallery ==
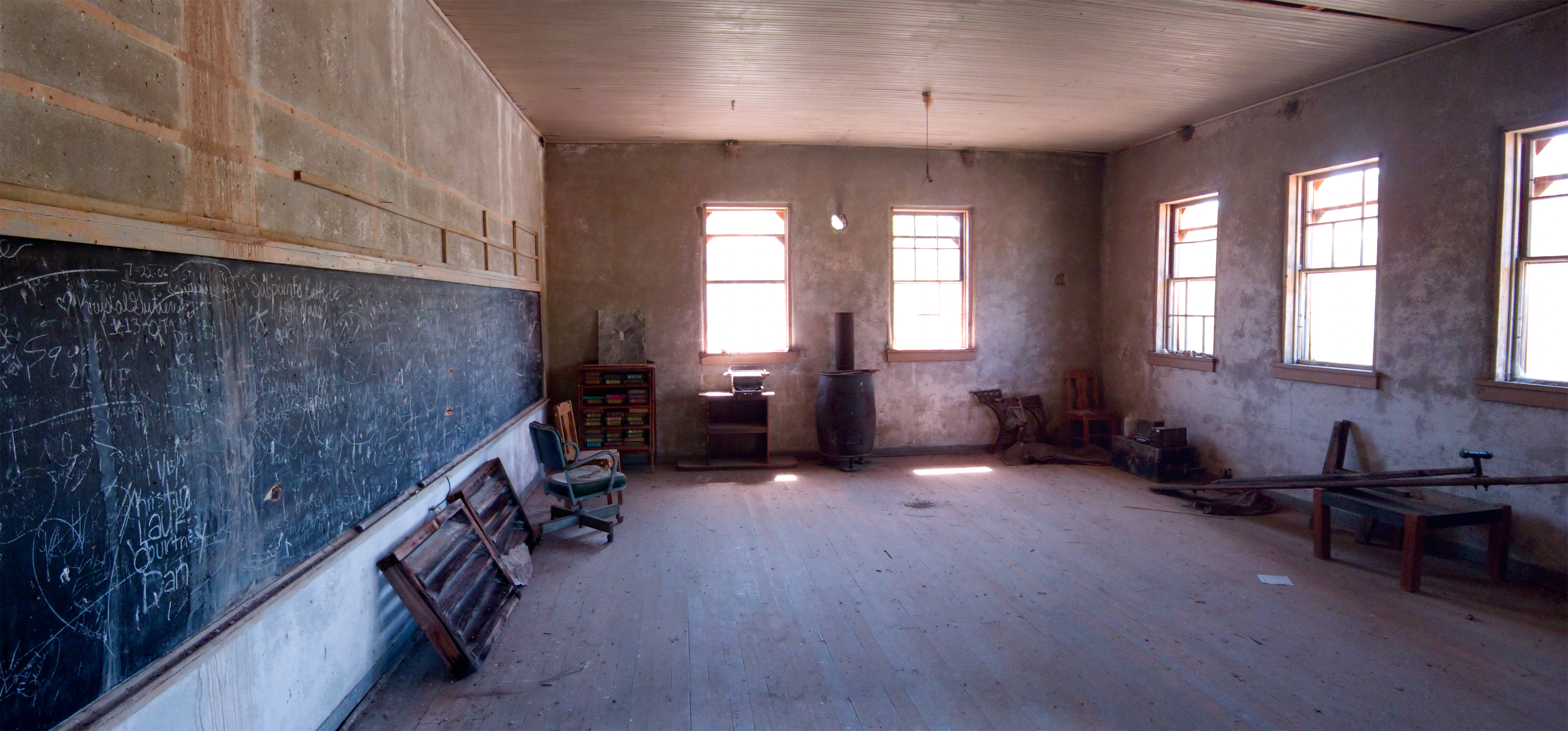
Schoolhouse in 2009

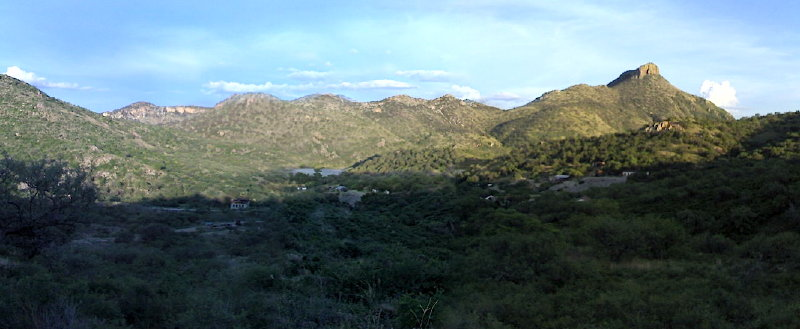
Ruby with view of Montana Peak

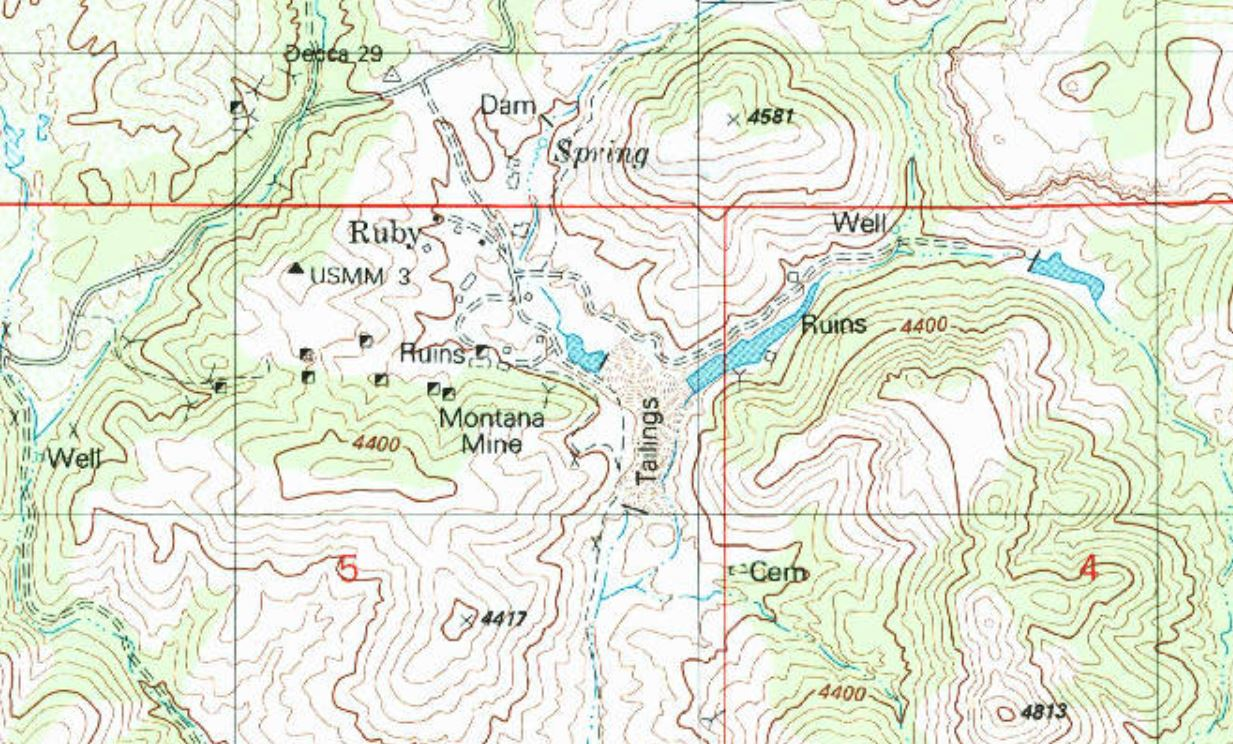
Section of USGS Ruby, Arizona topographic map

== See also ==
- Bear Valley Raid
- Battle of Bear Valley
- List of ghost towns in Arizona
