= Mission Camp =

Butterfield Overland Mail stagecoach stop in Arizona

- Locale
- Location within Arizona
- Coordinates: 32°40′33″N 114°13′9″W
- Country: United States
- State: Arizona
- County: Yuma
- Founded: 1858
- Abandoned: 1879

Population
  - Total: 0
- Time zone: UTC-7 (MST (no DST))

Mission Camp is a historic locale, site of a later Butterfield Overland Mail stagecoach station, located about four and a half miles (7.2 km) west of Wellton on the south bank of the Gila River, in Yuma County, Arizona. It was located 11.49 miles (18.49 km) miles east of Gila City, Arizona, 4.51 miles (7.26 km) west of the original Butterfield stage station at Filibusters Camp, and 15.14 miles (24.37 km) west of Antelope Peak Station, a later station that with Mission Camp Station replaced Filibusters Camp Station.

In 1862, during the American Civil War, the Union Army garrisoned a post at the stage station with California Volunteers. It was located about 35 miles (56 km) east of Yuma.

After stagecoach travel resumed in the late 1860s Mission Camp became a stagecoach station once again until 1879 when the Southern Pacific Railroad came into Arizona through Yuma, making it obsolete.
