= Griswell's Station =

Butterfield Overland Mail stagecoach stop in Arizona

- Locale
- Griswells (historical)
- Location in the state of Arizona
- Coordinates: 32°53′0″N 113°30′3″W
- Country: United States
- State: Arizona
- County: Yuma
- Elevation: 380 ft (120 m)
- Time zone: UTC-7 (MST (no DST))
- GNIS feature ID: 24011

Griswell's or Griswell's Station was a stagecoach station of the Butterfield Overland Mail located along the Gila River in Arizona. It was located 12 miles east of Peterman's Station and 15 miles west of Flap Jack Ranch Station.

Griswell's location is in Yuma County, Arizona at 32.88338°N 113.50075°W (NAD83) and at an elevation of 380 ft (120 m) MSL. It can be seen on the USGS 1:24K topographic map Horn, AZ.
