= Service station =

Service station may refer to:

- Filling station, a gasoline or petrol station
- Automobile repair shop, a place where automobiles are repaired
- Service centre or rest area, a public facility on motorways or controlled-access highways for resting or refuelling
  - Motorway service area, a rest area in the United Kingdom
- Service centre or truck stop
