= Ruby Murders =

Murders of six people near Ruby, Arizona (1920–1922)

- Part of the Border War, Mexican Revolution
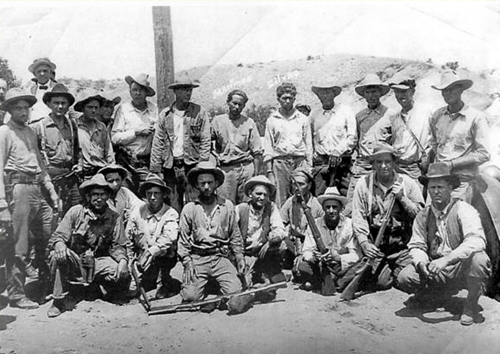
- The American posse which captured Manuel Martinez and Placidio Silvas, who can be seen in the center of the back row; photo from the Nogales Herald, July 20, 1922
- Location: Ruby, Arizona
- Date: February 27, 1920; August 26, 1921; July 13, 1922
- Weapon: Small arms
- Deaths: 6
- Injuries: 1

The Ruby Murders is the popular name for three separate incidents involving the deaths of six American citizens near the town of Ruby, Arizona. The first incident occurred in February 1920 when Mexican bandits robbed and killed the two owners of the Ruby Mercantile. A second attack happened in August 1921 when Mexican bandits robbed and killed the store's new owners. Two of the bandits were arrested for the crime, but they briefly escaped custody in July 1922 after killing another two men, which led to the largest manhunt in the history of the Southwest.

== Background ==
The mining town of Ruby was established in Bear Valley during the 1870s and was a haven for cattle rustlers and other criminals for most of its Old West history. Ruby was very small and its one general store was the sole business other than mining. The store was called the Ruby Mercantile, built sometime in the late 1880s, and it also served as the post office when it opened in 1912. In 1914, the mercantile was purchased by Philip C. Clarke, who later built a larger store a short distance from the original. The second building was an adobe structure, the remains of which have been preserved.

The Mexican Revolution erupted in 1910, and the town's proximity to the international border meant that it was harassed by bandits and rebels on many occasions. Rebels loyal to Pancho Villa were active throughout the Mexican territory opposite the Arizona border. The area was one of the hardest hit during the civil war, which fueled the lawlessness. By 1920, the town was declining, but it was still considered quite dangerous; the inhabitants were instructed to be heavily armed at all times. Clarke felt that the area was so dangerous that he kept either a pistol or a rifle in each room of his house and the store.

== Murders ==
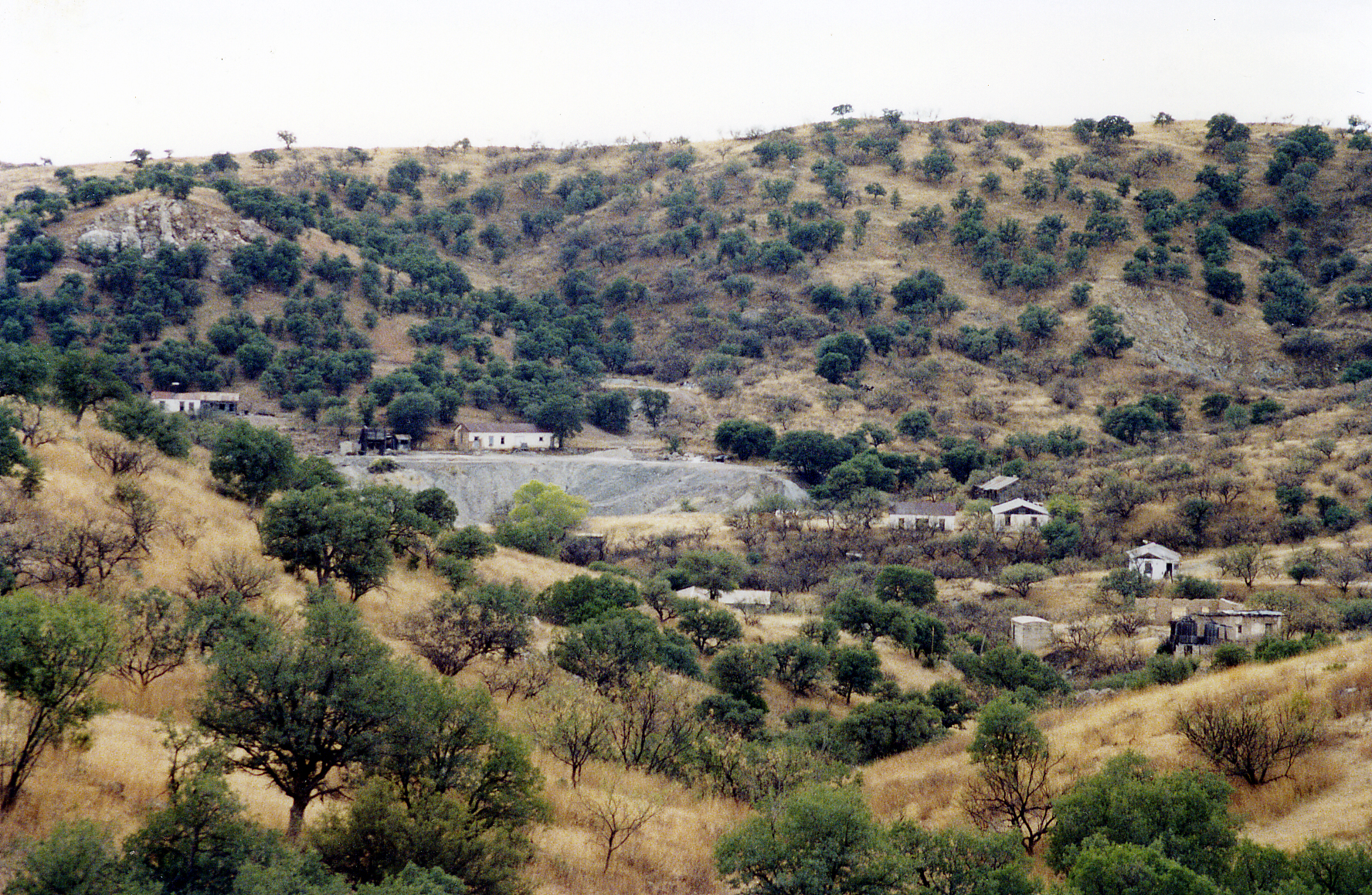
Ruby in 1990; the remains of the mercantile can be seen at the far right

=== February 27, 1920 ===
In February 1920, Clarke sold the mercantile to John and Alexander Frazer before moving his family to the nearby settlement of Oro Blanco. Eleven days after closing the deal with Clarke, on February 27, 1920, the Frazer brothers were both shot during a robbery of the store. Alexander was found lying on the floor near the cash register. He had been shot twice; one bullet wound was found in Alexander's head and the second in his back. John was found nearby. He was still alive, but unconscious, having been hit in the left eye by one bullet. He died five hours later without regaining consciousness. An investigation by police found that the bandits, later identified as Ezequiel Lara and Manuel Garcia, had robbed the place and cut the wires for the town's only telephone, which was located in the store. The police discovered two sets of footprints and also learned from the townspeople that two unknown Mexicans had been seen in the area. A local rancher reported that two of his best horses and eight of his cattle had been stolen at or near the same date, making the police assume the incidents were related. The Nogales newspaper Weekly Oasis said that the

tragedy is nothing new over there. In the wild and rugged region south from the Atascosa Mountains and the Bear Valley region, there has been always a harbor for a bunch of desperate characters, whose depredations have been felt by American cattlemen and ranchers through many years.

A posse led by Sheriff Raymond Earhardt was sent south along the bandit's trail, but they failed to catch up with the suspects. Months passed, during which time very little progress was made in the investigation. Finally, in October 1920, Garcia was killed during a gunfight with Pima County deputy sheriffs near Twin Buttes. Lara was eventually arrested in Mexico and jailed for crimes south of the border, but was never called to answer for his role in the Fraser killings.

=== August 26, 1921 ===
The second incident occurred in August 1921 following the transfer of the mercantile's ownership to a Mr. and Mrs. Frank Pearson, who lived in the store with their three daughters. Although Mr. Pearson was told about the previous killings and the situation on the border, he felt that a second attack on the store was unlikely to happen. However, on the morning of August 26, Frank and his wife Myrtle took a horseback ride into the surrounding hills and while doing so they spotted a group of seven Mexicans riding towards the town. The two thought that the Mexicans would likely want to visit the mercantile so they rode back to serve them. When the Mexicans entered the store they asked for tobacco and as soon as Mr. Pearson turned around to get it the bandits drew their pistols and fired into his back. Pearson was mortally wounded by two bullets, but he managed to grab his pistol under the counter and fire three shots wildly before dying.

After that the murderers turned their attention to Myrtle, who had five gold teeth. First, one bandit shot Myrtle in the neck to stop her screaming, then knocked out her gold teeth with his pistol. She was then shot a second time in the head and killed. Frank's daughter Elizabeth was also grazed in the arm, but other than that the three young girls were left unharmed. The Mexicans left after they emptied the safe and destroyed the telephone. They then rode out of town yelling and firing their guns in the air. When the Mexicans were gone the Pearson girls fled eight miles away to the nearest neighbor. This time when authorities were called for an ambulance was sent from Nogales, which tended to Elizabeth's wounds. Meanwhile, a large posse of citizens and lawmen began searching the surrounding desert. A United States Army biplane from the garrison at Nogales was also dispatched to participate in the search and it became the first aircraft to be used for a manhunt in the history of Arizona. A $5,000 bounty, dead or alive, was also authorized for each of the seven Mexicans, partly due to the fact that the gang was suspected of being responsible for the first robbery.

=== July 13, 1922 ===
A few months later, after the manhunt had ended unsuccessfully, the authorities received news that two men in a Sonora cantina had bragged about being responsible for robbing the Ruby Mercantile. American police investigated the claim, but it wasn't until April 1922 that any arrests were made. By chance, an Arizona deputy sheriff overheard a conversation between the bartender and a customer at a cantina in Sasabe, Sonora; the bartender was trying to sell five gold teeth he had acquired sometime earlier by an outlaw named Manuel Martinez. When the deputy saw the teeth, he was sure they belonged to Myrtle so he bought them and took them back to the United States. Martinez was known for associating with a Mexican named Placidio Silvas, who lived near Oro Blanco, so the two were arrested and put on trial for murder in May 1922. Both were found guilty of murder by the court of Santa Cruz County. Martinez was sentenced to death by hanging and Silvas received a life sentence to be served at the state prison in Florence. However, on July 13, while they were being transported in a police car, the two prisoners managed to break free after Sheriff George White wrecked the car he and deputy L.A. Smith were transporting the prisoners in. The police car was found later that day, rolled into a ditch near Continental, with the bodies of White and Smith nearby. White was killed at the scene, but Smith was still alive and taken to a hospital, where he died of his wounds.

The men who found White and Smith trailed the outlaws across the Santa Rita Mountains, but they lost track of them near Ruby due to a monsoon. The Arizona public was shocked about this latest double homicide so over 700 volunteers from Pima, Pinal, Cochise and Santa Cruz counties formed posses for the largest manhunt in the history of the Southwest. Initially, Martinez and Silvas evaded the search parties, but, six days after the escape, search dogs uncovered a bloodstained file, which put the posses back on the bandits' trail. That same day, Martinez and Silvas were found hiding under some brush in the Tumacacori Mountains, about seventy miles from the site where the two had escaped custody. The two Mexicans were re-tried in court and found guilty again, but the Mexican consul appealed the court's decision and obtained a writ, which delayed the case. Finally, the Supreme Court intervened and the matter was settled. Martinez was sentenced to death and executed by hanging on August 10, 1923. Silvas was put into prison at Florence, but he later escaped in 1928, never to be seen again.

== See also ==
- Battle of Bear Valley
- Power's Cabin Shootout
- Bandit War
