= Agua Caliente, Arizona =

Former resort in Maricopa County, Arizona

- Populated by three household
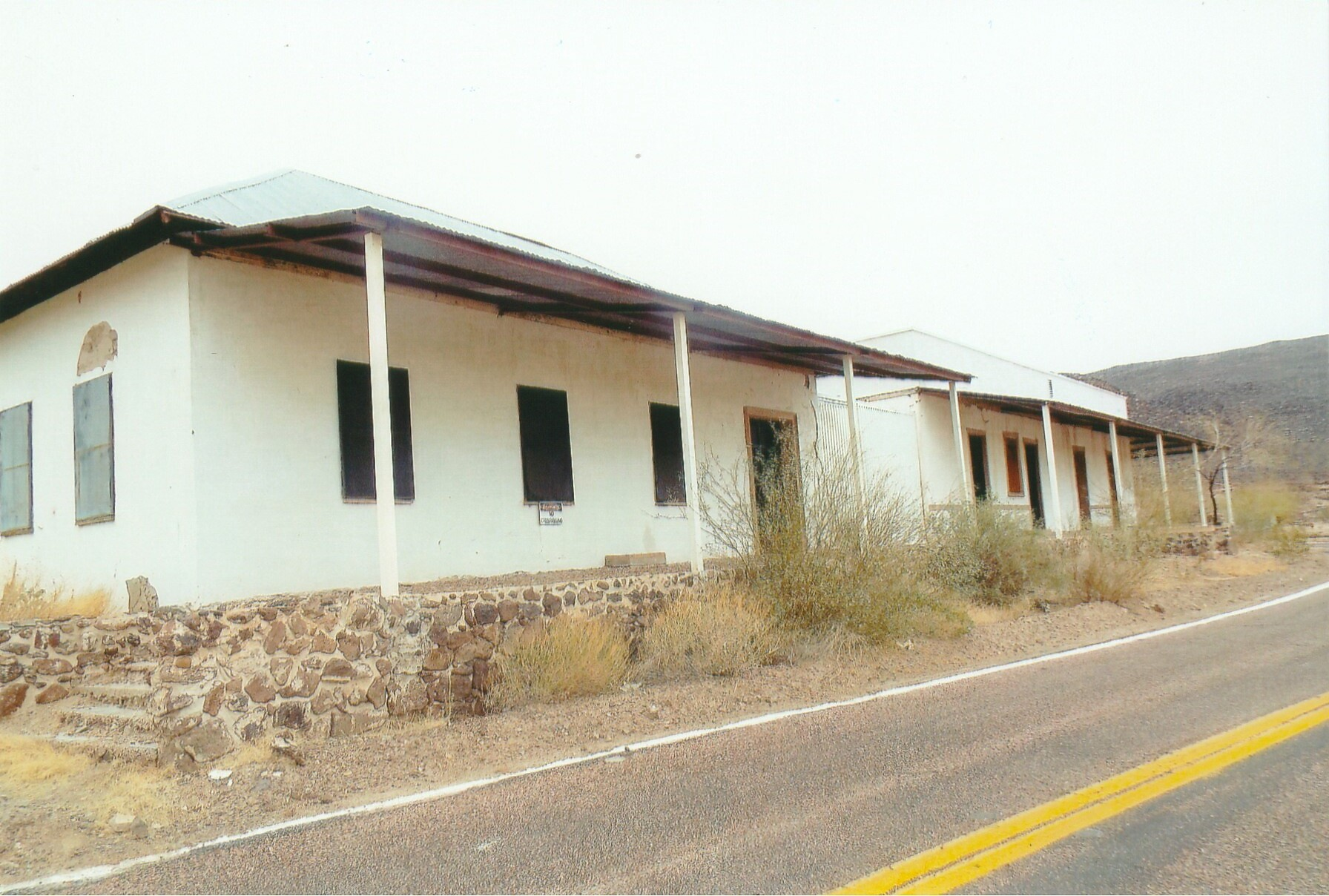
- Agua Caliente Resort

- Location within Arizona Location within the United States
- Country: United States
- State: Arizona
- County: Maricopa

Government
  - Mayor: Marko Sturdivanti
- Elevation: 456 ft (139 m)
- Time zone: UTC-7 (Mountain (MST))
  - Summer (DST): UTC-7 (MST)
- ZIP codes: 85333
- Area code: 520
- GNIS feature ID: U.S. Geological Survey Geographic Names Information System: Agua Caliente, Arizona

Agua Caliente in Maricopa County, Arizona on the border with Yuma County, is a place north of the Gila River near Hyder, Arizona. Named 'Santa Maria del Agua Caliente' in 1744 by Father Jacob Sedelmayer. In 1775, Father Francisco Garces used the current short form. The location was the site of a resort established at the site of nearby hot springs. Agua Caliente, a name derived from Spanish meaning "hot water", received its name from nearby hot springs which were originally used by the local Indigenous population.

== Demographics ==
Historical population
Census	Pop.	Note	%±
1900	113		—
1910	153		35.4%
1920	57		−62.7%
1930	60		5.3%
U.S. Decennial Census

Agua Caliente's population was 113 in 1900. Agua Caliente appeared as the Agua Caliente Precinct of Maricopa County on the 1910 U.S. Census. It appeared again in 1920 as Precinct 54 and 1930 simply as Agua Caliente Precinct again. In the latter census, it reported a White majority. With the combination of all Arizona county precincts into 3 districts each in 1940, it did not formally appear again on the census to date. Agua Caliente's population in 1940 was 60.

== Flap-Jack Ranch, Grinnell's and Stanwix Station ==
By 1858 Flap-Jack Ranch was located six miles from the Agua Caliente hot springs along the Gila River, 84 miles (135 km) from Fort Yuma. It was established as stagecoach station of the Butterfield Overland Mail. In 1862, it was called Grinnel's Ranch and was listed on the itinerary of the California Column in the same place as Flap Jack Ranch, (84 miles), from Fort Yuma on the route to Tucson. So too was what Union Army reports called Stanwix Ranch or Stanwix Station which became the site of the westernmost skirmish of the American Civil War. In the early part of the 20th century, the alignment of U.S. Route 80 in Arizona passed in front of the property, increasing traffic and making it a tourist stop on the cross national highway, until the road bypassed the area.

== Agua Caliente Ranch ==
John Ross Browne described his visit to the Agua Caliente Springs from Grinnel's Station in 1864:

While the Company were encamped at Grinnell's, Poston, White, and myself crossed the Gila, and rode about six miles to the ranch of Martin and Woolsey, situated near the Aqua Calliente. Mr. Woolsey had left, a few days before, with a large quantity of stock for the gold placers. We were hospitably entertained by his partner, Mr. Martin, who is trying the experiment of establishing a farm here by means of irrigation. The soil is excellent, and the prospect is highly encouraging. An abundant supply of water flows from the Aqua Calliente. We had a glorious bath in the springs next morning, which completely set us up after the dust and grit of the journey. They lie near the point of the hill, about a mile and a half from Martin's. I consider them equal to the baths of Damascus, or any other in the world. The water is of an exquisite temperature, and possesses some very remarkable qualities in softening the skin and soothing the nervous system. A Mr. Belcher lived at this place for four years, surrounded by Apaches. Indeed it was not quite safe now; and I could not but think, as Poston, White, and myself sat bobbing about in the water, what an excellent mark we made for any prowling Tontos that might be in the vicinity. It was here that the Indians who had in captivity the Oatman girls made their first halt after the massacre of the family. The barren mountains in the rear, and the wild and desert appearance of the surrounding country, accorded well with the impressive narrative of that disaster.

In 1873, Agua Caliente Ranch, still owned by King S. Woolsey, had become well known and visited by many people. A resort was built there in 1897 with 22 rooms and a swimming pool in which the hot waters from the spring collected for the use of the visitors. The remains of the hotel has survived into the present but the hot springs dried up as ground water was pumped out for irrigation.

Sam Hughes currently owns the Agua Caliente property that includes the hotel, which is no longer open, the caretakers quarters and approximately 2,700 acres (1,100 ha) of surrounding property. Some of the acreage is currently farmed; most of it is in its natural undisturbed state. There are also ruins of an old stone house, an old store and other old buildings in various states of decay.

== See also ==
- List of historic properties in Agua Caliente, Arizona
