= Station to Station (disambiguation) =

Station to Station is a 1976 album by David Bowie.

Station to Station may also refer to:

== Arts ==
- "Station to Station" (song), title song of the 1976 David Bowie album
- Station to Station (2015 film), 2015 experimental film
- Station to Station (2021 film), 2021 psychological drama
- "Station to Station" (Russian Doll)
- "Station to Station" (Star Wars Resistance)

== Telecommunications ==
- Station-to-station call, an operator-assisted telephone call
- Station-to-Station protocol, a cryptographic protocol

== See also ==
- Stations of the Cross, the devotion commemorating the Passion of Jesus Christ
