= The Station (video game) =

2018 atmospheric video game

- Developer: The Station
- Publisher: The Station
- Engine: Unity
- Platforms: Microsoft Windows; Linux; PlayStation 4 Xbox One
- Release: WW: February 20, 2018
- Mode: Single-player

The Station is an atmospheric science fiction mystery video game by American indie team The Station for Microsoft Windows, Linux, PlayStation 4, and Xbox One. It was released on February 20, 2018.

== Gameplay ==
The Station is set in outer space aboard a space station called The Espial. The player is sent aboard the Espial to investigate a malfunction. Throughout the game, the player solves various puzzles across the station while also finding the three astronauts still on board. Throughout the game, the player listens to audio messages from each of the crew members, building the story behind the events of the game.

== Plot ==
A group of three astronauts, Aiden, Mila and Silas, are sent aboard The Espial across space to study a recently discovered alien civilization. A malfunction causes the station to go dark. To rescue the crew, a recon specialist, the player, is sent to the ship to investigate.

== Development ==
The Station was developed and published by a small team of developers called The Station.

== Reception ==
The Station received "mixed or average" reviews across all platforms, according to review aggregator Metacritic. PC Gamer praised its unique atmospheric experience and short story. Push Square rated the PlayStation 4 version a 6/10, praising its atmosphere but criticizing the theme and character development. VideoGamer praised the game's variety of puzzles. Cubed3 rated the game a 7/10, praising the story but criticizing the "walking simulator"-like gameplay. Hardcore Gamer rated the game a 2/5, calling the game "disheartening". Gameplanet Australia rated the game a 7/10, calling the game "a very good science fiction short story in a fairly messy video game package." Game Informer gave the game a 6.5, criticizing the game for its lack of replayability but enjoyed the narrative. PlayStation Lifestyle rated the game an 8/10, praising the mystery of the environment but criticizing the long loading times on the PlayStation 4.
