= J. Barry Griswell =

J. Barry Griswell is former chairman and CEO of the Principal Financial Group and retired CEO of the Community Foundation of Greater Des Moines.

== Background ==
A native of Georgia, Griswell received his bachelor's degree from Berry College in Rome, Georgia and his master's degree from Stetson University in DeLand, Florida. Griswell joined The Principal in 1988 as an officer and agency vice president. He became senior vice president in 1991 and executive vice president in 1996. He was named president in 1998, became CEO in 2000 and chairman of the board in 2002. Griswell retired as CEO on May 1, 2008 and remains chairman of the board. Prior to his association with the Principal Financial Group, he served as president and CEO of MetLife Marketing Corporation, a distribution-marketing subsidiary of Metropolitan Life Insurance Company. Barry is also the retired CEO of the Community Foundation of Greater Des Moines.

== Honors and endeavors ==
Griswell is a 2003 Horatio Alger Association Distinguished American Award winner and the 2003 recipient of the Oscar C. Schmidt Iowa Business Leadership Award. He has been inducted into the Iowa Business Hall of Fame, is a recipient of the United Way of Central Iowa Alexis de Tocqueville Society award, a 2004 recipient of the Ellis Island Medal of Honor, a 2004 recipient of the Central Iowa Philanthropic Award for Outstanding Volunteer Fundraiser, and a 2006 recipient of the Business Committee for the Arts Leadership Award as well as a 2008 recipient of the American for the Arts Corporate Citizenship in the Arts Award. He has also received the Distinguished Alumni Award from Stetson University and a Distinguished Achievement Award from Berry College.

Griswell is active in various industry and community organizations, including serving on the boards of Herman Miller, Inc., the S.S. Huebner Foundation for Insurance Education, Americans for the Arts, United Way of America and L.L. Global (LIMRA/LOMA.) He is a current trustee of Central College in Pella, Iowa and Berry College in Rome, Georgia. He is chair of the Business Committee for the Arts.

He is also the past chair of the American Council of Life Insurers (ACLI), board member of The Business Roundtable, co-chair of the CEO Task Force on Health and Retirement Security, past president of the Federation of Iowa Insurers, past Chair of the Greater Des Moines Partnership, past chair of LIMRA and past chair of Life Underwriters Trainers Council (LUTC) and the National Tocqueville Council.

Griswell is a member of United Way International’s India Leadership Committee, a group committed to raising money in the United States to start and support United Ways throughout India.

In 2007 he was honored with an Honorary Doctorate of Humane Letters from Grand View College. He has received his Chartered Life Underwriter (CLU) designation and his Chartered Financial Consultant (ChFC) designation, and is a fellow of LIMRA Leadership Institute (LLIF).

In spring 2008, Griswell founded The Harvest Initiative, an endeavor to bring economic help to the people of Crow Creek County in South Dakota. Griswell has addressed his success and journey in overcoming adversity in the book The Adversity Paradox, an Unconventional Guide to Uncommon Business Success which he co-authored with Bob Jennings. The book was released April, 2009. Many newspapers, radio shows and blogs have recognized Griswell and Jennings, with their research, as experts on how adversity can create success.

Griswell is the retired CEO of the Community Foundation of Greater Des Moines. As CEO he led the following initiatives: Embrace Iowa which raised more than $8 million to help those affected by flooding in Iowa in 2008; the Evelyn K. Davis Center for Working Families which connects those it serves to meaningful employment; the Better Together Civility Speaker Series and Capital Crossroads, a five-year vision plan for the Greater Des Moines region.
