= Texas Hill (Arizona) =

Summit in Yuma County, Arizona, US

- Location within Arizona Location within the United States

Highest point
- Elevation: 784 ft (239 m) NAVD 88
- Prominence: 428 ft (130 m)
- Coordinates: 32°49′53″N 113°41′36″W

Geography
- Location: Yuma County, Arizona, U.S
- Topo map: USGS Texas Hill

Texas Hill is a summit and landmark in the valley of the Gila River in Yuma County, Arizona. It rises to an elevation of 784 feet (239 m) from the 330-foot (100 m) level of the valley around it on the north side of the river. The mountain projects out into the valley, from its north side narrowing it considerably at that point and its dark color makes it stand out for long distances up and down the valley.

== History ==
In 1849, during the beginning of the California Gold Rush, 49ers followed the Southern Immigrant Trail west to California along the Gila River Valley. Some of the main 49er routes from the eastern United States to the route through New Mexico Territory that passes Texas Hill, was through Texas and some of the earliest 49ers to reach California on this route came from Texas. How the summit came by the name is not known, but it had acquired the name by the time it first appeared on maps.

Texas Hill Station, a later Butterfield Overland Mail stagecoach station, one of several built in 1859 to increase the number of water stops and team changes along the drier and hotter sections of the route, was located about 2 miles east of Texas Hill.
