= Szczecin Scientific Society =

Szczecin Scientific Society (Polish: Szczecińskie Towarzystwo Naukowe, STN, Latin: Societas Scientarum Scecinensis) is a general scientific society in Szczecin, Poland, associating researchers of all scientific branches.

It was founded in 1956 with its headquarters in Szczecin as the main scientific society in the Western Pomerania region. Its main scope of activity is research on all aspects of (West) Pomeranian cities and regions, it organizes scientific conferences and popular lectures, publishes books and periodicals.

Main publications:

- Prace Wydziałów STN
- Naukowy Informator Pomorza Zachodniego (since 1971)
