= John Ross Browne =

Irish-American traveler, artist, writer and government agent (1821–1875)

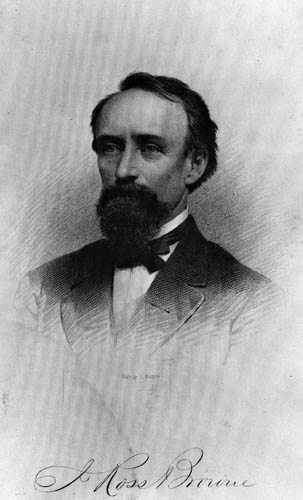
John Ross Browne

John Ross Browne (February 11, 1821 in Beggars Bush, Dublin, Ireland – December 9, 1875 in Oakland, California), often called J. Ross Browne, date of birth sometimes given as 1817, was an Irish-born American traveler, artist, writer and government agent. He was Minister to China.

In the late 1970s, Ralston Purina opened a chain of seafood restaurants named after Browne, called J Ross Browne's Whaling Station.

== Biography ==
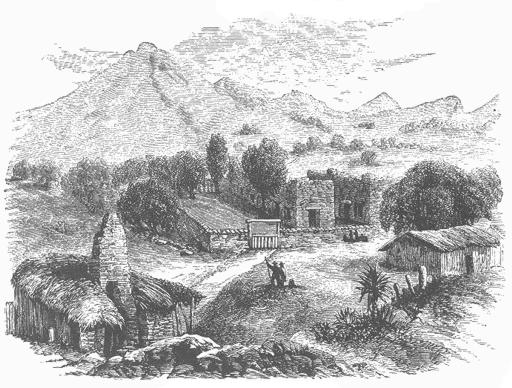
Mowry, Arizona in 1864 by J. Ross Browne.

John Ross Browne was the third of seven children born to Thomas Egerton Browne, an Irish newspaper editor, and his wife, Elizabeth (Buck) Browne. Thomas Browne was an ardent nationalist who ran afoul of the Dublin Castle administration and was sent to prison, but released on condition of his leaving Ireland. In 1832 or 1833 the family emigrated to the United States. They settled in Louisville, Kentucky, where Thomas became a schoolteacher and eventually editor and proprietor of the Louisville Daily Reporter.

Browne briefly attended Louisville Medical Institute, an experience that inspired his first book, Confessions of a Quack (1841). In 1842, after working several years on a riverboat, he signed on to a whaling ship. In 1846 he published the book Etchings of a Whaling Cruise at Harper & Brothers, New York, which earned him recognition as an artist and writer, and is thought to have influenced Herman Melville. He married Lucy Anne Mitchell in 1844. The couple had nine children.

In 1849, at the time of the California Gold Rush, Browne moved to California and worked in various jobs for the government, as an agent for the Treasury Department, surveyor of customs houses and mints, investigator of Indian and Land Office affairs, and official reporter for the state constitutional convention. He published parts of these experiences in the popular press as From Crusoe's Island (1864). He then went on a trip to Europe and the Middle East, published his impressions serially at Harper's Magazine and then in book form as Yusef (1853). Browne and his family moved in 1861 to Germany, an experience that resulted in An American Family in Germany (1866), with Browne's side trips detailed in The Land of Thor (1866). In 1863 he returned to the American West, vividly describing Arizona, Sonora and other regions in his Adventures in the Apache Country (1869). He was appointed Minister to China in 1868, but was recalled in 1870.

Browne died December 9, 1875, in Oakland, California. The style of his writings influenced a number of authors such as Mark Twain, Bret Harte and Dan De Quille.

== Published writings ==
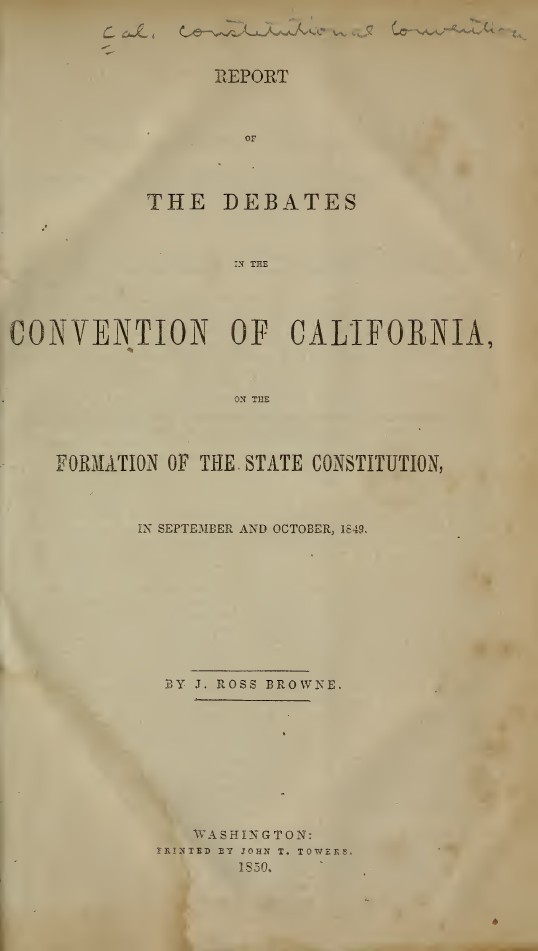
Report of the Debates in the Convention of California (1850)

- 1841 – Confessions of a quack, or, The auto-biography of a modern Aesculapian, James B. Marshall Publisher, Louisville, Kentucky, 1841. OCLC 5230489

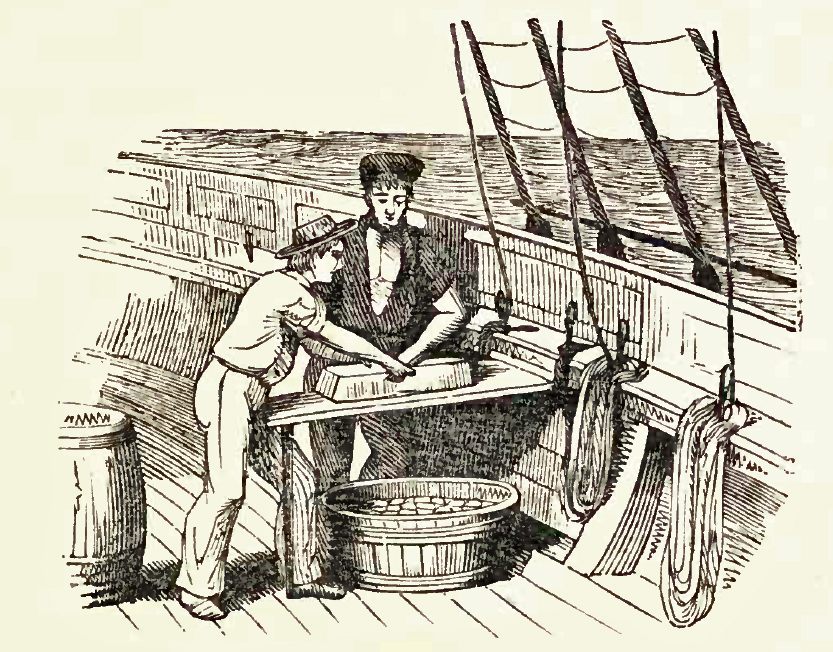
Two men mincing whale blubber from Etchings of a Whaling Cruise (1846)

- 1850 – Etchings of a whaling cruise: with notes of a sojourn on the island of Zanzibar, to which is appended a brief history of the whale fishery, its past and present condition, Harper and Brothers, New York, 1850, OCLC 18688057
- 1850 – Report of the debates in the Convention of California, Printed by J.T. Towers, Washington, 1850, OCLC 654476750
- 1853 – Yusef: or, The Journey of the Frangi; A crusade in the East, Harper and Brothers, New York, 1853
- 1858 – Indian affairs in the Territories of Oregon and Washington: letter from the Secretary of the Interior, transmitting, in compliance with the resolution of the House of Representatives of the 19th instant, the report of J. Ross Browne, special agent, on the subject of Indian affairs in the Territories of Oregon and Washington, January 25, 1858, referred to the Committee on Indian Affairs and ordered to be printed. Ex. doc. / 35th Congress, 1st Session, House of Representatives, no. 39, Washington: U.S. Government Printing Office, 1858, OCLC 9654708
- 1860 – A Peep at Washoe, Harpers New Monthly Magazine, December 1860.
- 1860 – Report of the Secretary of the Interior, communicating, in compliance with a resolution of the Senate, the correspondence between the Indian Office and the present superintendents and agents in California, and J. Ross Browne, Esq.: together with the report of the Commissioner of Indians Affairs, inclosing the same to the department. Executive Document of the Senate, Congress of the United States, 1860, OCLC 16852850
- 1861 – The Old Sea King: or, the wonderful adventures of Little Miché, Harper's Weekly, no. 212, January 19, 1861, p. 44–45, OCLC 62718058
- 1861–1862 – The Coast Rangers: a chronicle of adventures in California, Paisano Press, Balboa Island, Calif. 1959, reprinted from Harper's New Monthly Magazine, volumes 23–24, 1861–62. Part 2 title: "The Indian Reservations"
- 1864 – From Crusoe's Island: a Ramble in the Footsteps of Alexander Selkirk, Harper and Brothers, New York, 1864
- 1864 – California's Indians: A Clever Satire on the Governments dealings with its Indian Wards, Published by Harper Brothers in 1864, reprint.
- 1864–1865 – A tour through Arizona: San Francisco, California to Casa Grande, Arizona in October and November of 1864. Harper's New Monthly Magazine, Oct.–Dec., 1864, Jan.–March, 1865, OCLC 12044825
- 1865 – Washoe Revisited, Harpers New Monthly Magazine, May, 1865.
- 1865 – Down in the cinnabar mines; a visit to New Almaden in 1865, Harper's New Monthly Magazine, October 1865, (v. 31, no. 185), OCLC 42687253
- 1865 – The Bodie Bluff mines located in Mono county, California belonging to the Empire gold & silver mining co. of New York. With pen and pencil, Clark & Maynard, New York, 1865, OCLC 13851324
- 1865 – A trip to Bodie Bluff and the Dead Sea of the West. Harper's New Monthly Magazine, Sept. 1865, no. 184, OCLC 21697588
- 1866 – An American Family in Germany, Harper and Brothers, New York, 1866, OCLC 325598
- 1866 – The Reese River country, Harper's New Monthly Magazine, June 1866 (v. 33, no. 193), OCLC 18708280
- 1867 – The Land of Thor, Harper and Brothers, New York, 1867
- 1867 – Report of J. Ross Browne on the mineral resources of the states and territories west of the Rocky Mountains, United States Department of the Treasury, Washington, General Printing Office, 1867. OCLC 7940016, part of Reports upon the mineral resources of the United States
- 1868 – Explorations in Lower California, Three papers in Harper's New Monthly Magazine, October, November & December 1868, OCLC 20538246
- 1869 – Adventures in the Apache Country: A Tour Through Arizona and Sonora, with Notes on the Silver Regions of Nevada, Harper & Brothers, 1869. Also published in Harper's New Monthly Magazine, no. 173 (Oct. 1864) – 178 (Mar. 1865) (also numbered v. 29–30)
- 1869 – Sketch of the settlement and exploration of Lower California, H. H. Bancroft, San Francisco, 1869, OCLC 795679890 – Also included as Part 2 of "Resources of the Pacific Slope"
- 1869 – Resources of the Pacific slope. A statistical and descriptive summary of the mines and minerals, climate, topography, agriculture, commerce, manufactures, and miscellaneous productions, of the states and territories west of the Rocky mountains, coauthor Alexander S. Taylor, D. Appleton and Company, New York, 1869 OCLC 663205480
- 1870 – The policy of extending local aid to railroads, with special reference to the proposed line through the San Joaquin Valley to the Colorado River, Alta California printing House, San Francisco, 1870, OCLC 13851599
- 1872 – Reclamation of marsh and swamp lands and projected canals for irrigation in California: with notes on the canal systems of China, and other countries, Alta California printing House, San Francisco, 1872, OCLC 13851612
- 1872 - Some of his illustrations are used by the American Publishing Company in Roughing It by Mark Twain.
- 1875 – Address to the territorial pioneers of California, on the twenty-fifth anniversary of the admission of the State into the Union, San Francisco News Letter and California Advertiser, San Francisco, 1875, OCLC 11883585

== See also ==
- Mowry Massacres
- 1860 Wiyot Massacre
