= Peterman's Station =

Butterfield Overland Mail stagecoach stop in Arizona

- Locale
- Location within Arizona Location within the United States
- Coordinates: 32°46′5″N 113°48′53″W
- Country: United States
- State: Arizona
- County: Yuma
- Elevation: 299 ft (91 m)
- Time zone: UTC-7 (MST (no DST))

Peterman's Station is a historic locale, site of a ranch and stage station located along the Gila River. It was first established by a man named Peterman, in 1857 along the route of the San Antonio-San Diego Mail Line, later a station of its successor, the Butterfield Overland Mail, 19 miles east of Filibuster Camp, 12 miles west of Griswell's Station.

Isaiah C. Woods, operating manager of the San Antonio–San Diego Mail while establishing the route, described Peterman's Station on his return from San Diego on November 9, 1857:

November 9 – Today we left Peterman's station, (on the bank of the Gila,) consisting of a log house and excellent corral, built since I passed here. Peterman told me he had built this station, which he intended making his permanent residence, in order to obtain the business of the main line. I purchased of him several tons of mezquit beans, besides contracting for a supply of hay. The soil in this neighborhood is excellent. Already this enterprising pioneer has contracted with a party of Mexicans to build a main irrigating ditch from the Gila, with branches sufficient to enable him to cultivate several hundred acres of land. The Mexicans are now at work. I made such arrangements for him, by writing to an agent at Fort Yuma, as would secure the necessary barley for seed, making at the same time a conditional purchase of all his crop. He felt confident of gathering a good harvest the present season. Peterman originally came up here from Fort Yuma to execute a contract for several tons of mezquit bean, made with the parties who are contractors for hauling the ore of the Arizona Copper Mining Company to Fort Yuma.

By the time of the Civil War Petermans was called Mohawk Station in Union Army reports.
