= Locale (geographic) =

Definition of a geographical term

As defined by the United States Geological Survey, a locale is a geographic place at which there is or was human activity. It does not include populated places (such as cities, settlements, towns, or villages), mines, and dams. Locale indicates locations of more dispersed, periodic or temporary human activity, such as a crossroad, a camp, a farm, a landing, a railroad siding, a ranch, a windmill, or one of any of the various types of agricultural, communication, geographical, infrastructure, or transport stations where human activities are carried out.

Locale also indicates locations of former locales and incidents of human activity, such as a battlefield or historic site, and former locations of populated places such as a ghost town, ruins, or an archaeological site.
