= Monica Muñoz Martinez =

American historian

- Born: Uvalde, Texas
- Known for: Latino studies, immigration, the history of violence and policing, anti-Mexican violence in the Southwestern United States

Academic background
- Education: Brown University; Yale University

Academic work
- Discipline: History
- Institutions: Brown University; UT Austin

Monica Muñoz Martinez is a scholar of Mexican-American history current serving as an associate professor of history at the University of Texas at Austin. Martinez was previously the Stanley J. Bernstein Assistant Professor of American Studies and Ethnic Studies at Brown University and an Andrew Carnegie Fellow. Her research has been supported by the Andrew W. Mellon Foundation, the Woodrow Wilson National Fellowship Foundation, and the Texas State Historical Association. She has received praise for her work on several public history projects and her first book, The Injustice Never Leaves You: Anti-Mexican Violence in Texas was published in 2018 and received numerous awards. In 2021 she received a "Genius Grant" from the MacArthur Foundation.

== Background ==
Monica Muñoz Martinez was born in Uvalde, Texas. She received her B.A. from Brown University's Department of Ethnic Studies and American Civilization and her Ph.D. from Yale University's Department of American Studies. After completing her doctorate, she conducted post-doctoral research at the University of Texas at Austin with the Center for Mexican American Studies studying the history and legacy of anti-Mexican violence along the Texas borderlands.

== Academic career ==
Muñoz Martinez was the Stanley J. Bernstein Assistant Professor of American Studies and Ethnic Studies at Brown University and an Andrew Carnegie Fellow. Her areas of research include Latino studies, immigration, and the history of violence and policing, with an emphasis on the history of anti-Mexican violence in the Southwestern United States and the legacy violence has on people today. Discussing her goal of shedding light on the legacy of violence, she stated, "I wanted to study the longer legacies of violence," ... "Historians think in terms of concrete time frames. But now I was meeting descendants who were still being impacted by the violence. It still resonates today."

She is a co-founder of Refusing to Forget, a non-profit organization dedicated to researching and raising public awareness of current and past racial violence in Texas.

Her first book The Injustice Never Leaves You: Anti-Mexican Violence in Texas was published by Harvard University Press in 2018 and has received numerous awards and positive reviews in academic journals. Commenting on her book she stated her goal was attempting “to recover history that’s been forgotten or disavowed and make it public." The book is centered around three episodes of violence in the Texas borderlands: the 1910 lynching of Antonio Rodríguez; the 1915 murders of Jesus Bazán and Antonio Longoria by Texas Rangers; and the 1918 Porvenir massacre of fifteen Tejanos by Texas Rangers. The book continues with a history of the efforts by José Tomás Canales in 1919 to bring criminal charges against several Texas Rangers for their involvement in terrorizing and murdering Mexican Americans and the House-Senate committee hearings that investigated the murders and violence perpetrated by the Texas Rangers in the borderlands.

Martinez was part of the research team for the project "Mapping Violence", documenting the history of racial violence in Texas during 1900–1930.

In 2019, Martinez gave testimony in Congress during Judiciary Committee hearings on the "Oversight of the Trump Administration’s Border Policies and the Relationship Between Anti-Immigrant Rhetoric and Domestic Terrorism".

Her professional affiliations include the Organization of American Historians, the American Studies Association, the National Council for Public Humanities, the National Association of Chicana Chicano Studies, the Western History Association and the American Historians Association.

=== Awards ===
- 2019: The Caughey Western History Prize (Western History Association).
- 2019: The Robert G. Athearn Award (Western History Association).
- 2019: The Lawrence W. Levine Award (Organization of American Historians).
- 2019: María Elena Martínez Prize in Mexican History (Conference on Latin American History, University of North Carolina at Charlotte).
- 2019: Frederick Jackson Turner Award Finalist (Organization of American Historians).
- 2019: Tejas Foco Nonfiction Book Award (National Association of Chicana and Chicano Studies).
- 2019: The TCU Texas Book Award.

=== Grants and fellowships ===
During her first year at Brown University, Martinez was the recipient of the Mellon Mays Undergraduate Fellowship awarded by The Andrew W. Mellon Foundation. Since completing her Ph.D. in 2012, has been the recipient of numerous grants and fellowships. These include:

- 2021: MacArthur Fellowship
- 2017-2019: Carnegie Foundation for the Advancement of Teaching Faculty Fellowship for "New Narratives for Reckoning with Histories of Violence" and "Mapping Segregated Histories of Racial Violence".
- 2017-2019: National Endowment for the Humanities Grant. Awarded to support a conference and anthology about the Canales investigation into Texas Ranger violence.
- 2016: Research SEED Award, Brown University for "Mapping Segregated Histories of Racial Violence".
- 2014: Texas Humanities Grant, National Endowment for the Humanities.
- 2013: Catarino & Evangelina Hernéndez Research Fellowship, Texas State Historical Association.
- 2012-2014: Carlos E. Castaäeda Fellowship, Center for Mexican American Studies University of Texas at Austin.

=== Bibliography ===
- Book Review: Corridors of Migration: The Odyssey of Mexican Laborers, 1600-1933 by Rodolfo F. Acuña (2009). Western Historical Quarterly, 40(3), pp. 393–394.
- Book Review: Seeking Inalienable Rights: Texans and Their Quest for Justice by Debra A. Reid. (2012). Louisiana History: The Journal of the Louisiana Historical Association, 53(1), pp. 122–124.
- Recuperating Histories of Violence in the Americas: Vernacular History-Making on the US-Mexico Border. (2014). American Quarterly, 66(3), pp. 661–689.
- Porvenir Massacre (2017). Handbook of Texas Online, Texas State Historical Association.
- The Injustice Never Leaves You: Anti-Mexican Violence in Texas (2018). Cambridge, MA: Harvard University Press. ISBN 978-0674976436
- Mapping Segregated Histories of Racial Violence. American Quarterly. 70(3), pp. 657–663.
- How ‘The Highwaymen’ whitewashes Frank Hamer and the Texas Rangers. (2019). The Washington Post.

=== Public history projects ===
- Life and Death on the Border, 1910–1920. Bullock Texas State History Museum. Museum Exhibit.
- Mapping Violence. Academic collaboration documenting previously forgotten or concealed cases of racial violence in Texas between 1900 – 1930.
- Refusing To Forget. Educational non-profit organization focused on raising public awareness about anti-immigrant violence along the US-Mexico border.
- Texas Historical Commission Historical Markers project. Martinez worked to place four historical markers along the US-Mexico border at locations of major acts of anti-Mexican violence.

== See also ==
- 1917 Bath riots
- Anti-Mexican sentiment
- Hispanophobia
- La Matanza (1910–1920)
- Porvenir Massacre
