= Raid on Norias Ranch =

1915 raid by Mexican Seditionistas near Kingsville, Texas

Coordinates: 26.7899°N 97.7767°W

Raid on the Norias Division of the King Ranch
- Part of the Bandit War, Mexican Revolution
- Left to right: Monroe Fox, Henry Ransom and Tom Tate on horseback with dead Mexican bandits, Norias Division, August 9, 1915
Date	August 8, 1915
Location	Norias, Kenedy County, Texas
Result	United States victory: Retreat of Sediciosos

Belligerents
United States	Sediciosos

Commanders and leaders
(United States) Corporal Allen Mercer	(Mexico) Luis de la Rosa

Strength
16	~60

Casualties and losses
4 wounded	5-15+ killed

The Raid on the Norias Division of the King Ranch was an attack August 8, 1915 by a large band of disaffected Mexicans and Tejanos in southern Texas. It was one of the many small battles of the Mexican Revolution that spilled over into United States soil and resulted in an increased effort by the United States Army to defend the international border. Five to fifteen attackers were killed in the raid and more among the wounded may have died shortly afterwards.

== Background ==
When Mexico ceded its claim on Texas to the United States, the treaty protected the rights of Tejanos who became U. S. citizens. There was never any official policy to force them off their land, but banking practices at the time made it difficult for people of color to obtain credit from banks. With each drought and economic depression during the nineteenth and early twentieth centuries, Tejanos would lose land which Anglos would then buy up, increasing the size of their holdings. Hispanics on both sides of the border between Texas and Mexico came to hate the ranches as they saw businesses like the King Ranch increase their land in the hard times when Tejanos were losing theirs. The rapid expansion of railroads into south Texas in the late nineteenth century also brought a flood of Anglo Americans wanting land when these large ranches then subdivided. This drove up property prices as well as taxes, increasing Hispanic animosity against the United States and Anglos in general. Into this tense situation the infighting and turmoil of the Mexican Revolution sent waves of refugees north across the border, rapidly increasing demand for goods, services and competition for land and jobs.

In January 1915 the Plan of San Diego was drafted by Mexican political prisoners in Monterrey, Mexico which called for Hispanics, Blacks and Japanese in the U. S. border states to rebel against the government and kill all white male inhabitants more than sixteen years old as a first step in creating their own republic. The Plan came to light when one its signatories entered the U. S. to gather support for Venustiano Carranza, leader of one of the factions in the revolution, but was arrested by officials in Texas who supported Pancho Villa. It was found in his belongings and he was taken to Brownsville where he was questioned by Immigration Service inspectors there. Scholars believe the Plan was supported by Carranza as a means of gathering favor for his faction in the revolution. During the years of this strife, though, it was believed that Germany had a hand in the border friction, hoping to distract the United States from involvement in the First World War by destabilizing relations between the U.S. and its southern neighbor. But relations between Carranza himself and Germany at the time made this impossible. In any case, the overall plan was so unrealistic that it changed many times and resulted in only a few small raids into Texas from the Mexican state of Tamaulipas. The raid on Norias Division was one of these.

Norias, a southern division of the 825,000-acre King Ranch, is located about seventy miles north of Brownsville and about sixty miles south of Kingsville in what was at the time the newly-formed Kenedy County. A watering stop for the St. Louis, Brownsville and Mexico Railway, the site itself resembled a hamlet. Fifty feet west of the tracks was the two-story wooden building that served as headquarters with a kitchen out the back. A netting fence topped with barbed wire surrounded the house and a bit of yard. A hundred feet north of the headquarters were two bunkhouses. Three hundred feet south of the headquarters was the section house where a few Hispanic railway workers and their families lived. Across the tracks from the section house was a tool shed and a pile of railway ties.

== Raid ==
=== Prelude ===
On August 8, ranch manager Caesar Kleberg was in Kingsville when he learned that a large group of armed Mexican men on horseback were stealing horses at El Sauz, the division of the King Ranch on Norias' southern border. Kleberg immediately telephoned the U. S. Army commander at Fort Brown near Brownsville who informed the head of the Texas Rangers, Adjutant General Henry Hutchings. Hutchings assembled thirteen rangers led by Captains Henry Ransom, George J. Head and James Monroe Fox, and seven privates from Troop C of the 12th Cavalry Regiment led by Corporal Allen Mercer. Frank Hamer, who would later be instrumental in the pursuit of gangsters Bonnie and Clyde, was also present for the upcoming fight. Mercer commandeered a special train to leave at two pm, ninety minutes earlier than usual, go to the Norias Division to investigate. Immigration inspector D. P. Gay, whose department had investigated the Plan of San Diego, was at the Brownsville station and saw the train leave early. He learned from the station master about the bandits so he got his rifle and ammunition and caught the normal northbound train to Norias at about 3:30. Customs inspector Joe Taylor was on the platform at the San Benito station when Gay's train got there and on hearing what was afoot, Taylor joined him. When the two of them got to Harlingen they were joined by another Customs Inspector, Marcus Hinds, and Cameron county deputy sheriff Gordon Hill.

The soldiers arrived at Norias before four pm. General Hutchings ordered Mercer and the cavalrymen to stay behind with the ranch personnel. Ranch foreman Tom Tate provided the rangers with horses and, taking along a few ranch hands, rode back south with them toward the El Sauz Division. While they were gone the second train arrived at about 5:30 pm, dropping off the heavily armed Gay, Taylor, Hinds and Hill. The soldiers were met by more armed cowboys of the Norias Ranch, consisting of Frank Martin, Luke Snow, and Lauro Cavazos Sr., as well as ranch carpenter George Forbed and his wife. Though technically civilians and employees of the ranch, the group, nonetheless, volunteered to assist the American forces. These cowboys and a few lawmen positioned themselves near the train tracks to beat back any incursions in that area. Other civilians, mostly railworkers, were also kept near the section house.

=== Battle ===
Gay and his party were invited to supper. Shortly eating, they were on the porches and in the yard when Inspector Hinds noticed a group of men on horseback approaching from the south. The track foreman also had seen them. He grabbed his wife and toddler and ducked with them into a boxcar on a siding. Initially Hinds thought the riders were the rangers returning from their patrol. But when they were about a quarter of a mile away, Taylor noticed their sombreros and the white flag they carried, a Sediciosos banner, and warned of a Mexican attack. Gay later swore that he and Joe Taylor, Marcus Hinds, Gordon Hill, Frank Martin, Lauro Cavazos Sr., King Ranch employees and eight soldiers were the only defense the ranch had in the ensuing fight. Coming against them was a mix of nearly eighty Carranza soldiers and Tejano supporters of the Plan of San Diego, armed with Mauser rifles and led by Carranza officers. They expected easy pickings, assuming that only four cowboys were at the ranch. Their plan was to derail and rob the night train, rob the ranch storehouse, then burn the buildings.

The Sediciosos, when they were about 250 yards away to the south, waved a red flag and opened fire. Manuela Flores and the rest of the railway employees fled to the section house with their families. Some of the defenders dove for the scant cover of the rail tracks at the fence. Others told the two wives to lay on the floor and covered them with mattresses. Seeing bullets fly through the walls of the house, they then ran outside to draw fire away from it and took cover, preparing to shoot from behind a water trough and rolls of fencing wire. Two of the soldiers and Frank Martin were shot before they found cover. The shot that hit Frank broke his arm in two places, but he would survive this day to become a deputy sheriff. As the defenders engaged in that firefight they discovered that another party of invaders had sneaked up to the east, about 90 yards away, catching them in a crossfire. Fifteen or so of the bandits to the east moved to the south and took cover in the tool shed and behind the pile of railway ties. Some also broke into the railway section house where the workers were sheltering. Manuela's son later told Gay that this group's leader commanded her to tell him how many gringos there were but she swore at him and told him to find out for himself so he shot her in the head, killing her instantly.

When the defenders ran low on ammunition, twenty-one year-old Lauro Cavazos dashed to the house through the whizzing gunfire, grabbed some and dashed back with it, distributing it to them. The losses in the first attack left the defenders with thirteen able-bodied gunmen to fight off about seventy-eight bandits who were firing at them from the east, the south, the tool shed, the piled railway ties and the section house. But Cavazos shot the horse of one of the leaders out from under him, stalling a charge and allowing the wounded to be carried into the house. George Forbes was shot in the lung while helping move the wounded. A few of the marauders advancing from the east tried to climb the fence between the tracks and the house but got hung up in the barbed wire atop it and were shot there. Seeing the fence stopping these bandits, and realizing these bandits provided a bit of cover, the defenders stayed at the house and fired from its doors and windows. They fired at the raiders to the east and south and the ones at the tool shed, but they were reluctant to return fire at the section house because of the rail workers in the building.

Ranch cook Albert Edmonds braved the bullets flying through the house's walls to reach the telephone on the outer wall, crank it to life and call Caesar Kleberg, asking for his help. Kleberg told Edmonds that a train in Kingsville was ready to leave, loaded with armed men, supplies, and medical people, but no one was willing to operate it to Norias. Afterward Edmunds carried water to each defender, firing the defender's weapon while he drank. As the hours passed, dusk came with no help arriving for the defenders and their ammunition running very low. The Sediciosos then made a charge on foot that Joe Taylor stopped by killing the leader from forty yards' distance. This threw the marauders into confusion and they retreated southward into the darkening night, strapping their wounded to their horses. They had expected to rob and terrorize a few civilians, not face heavily armed soldiers and government agents. They lost five more as wounded bandits strapped to the horses died on the retreat and were found buried in the sand later.

Thinking that there were still bandits in the section house and tool shed, the defenders held their ground in the headquarters, watching and waiting. After an hour or so they heard riders approach. Repeated phone calls to Sarita, Kingsville and Brownsville had been made and one must have been underway at this moment because newspapers reported that the bandits returned. However, it was the rangers. Cavazos prevented further bloodshed by recognizing Tom Tate's voice. The rangers were utterly ignorant of gun the battle they had missed and the party of Sediciosos they had passed three times, once on the train and twice on horseback. The defenders yelled out that the house was surrounded by Mexicans. Captain Fox ran up the railway line to the section house where he found Manuela Flores dead and the rest of the terrified rail workers and their families huddled together. The track foreman and his family emerged unhurt from the boxcar. Thinking it empty, the Sediciosos ignored it and it was only hit by stray bullets.

=== Reinforcements ===
Captain Ransom began to find fault with the way the defenders had conducted themselves. Joe Taylor retorted that the rangers had not been there, the defenders had been. They had been there when the Sediciosos arrived and when they left, and they had not lost a single man. Sheriff Hill also lost his temper and invited the rangers to track the bandits in the dark brush themselves if they were as brave as they thought the defenders should have been. The rangers chose to reconnoiter the vicinity of the ranch compound and found the dead bandits and one badly injured one, as well as the white flag of the rebels. The injured man claimed he had been forced to join the bandits and said they planned to win back the Rio Grande region for Mexico. He died some time that night or the next day. Some hinted the rangers killed him, though contemporary newspaper accounts say he died of his wounds.

At about midnight a special train from Brownsville arrived carrying two troops of cavalry as well as the sheriffs of Cameron and Hidalgo counties. A few hours later, at 2:00 am, a group of fifty-two rebels led by Antonio Roche and Dario Morada arrived at the Cerritos subdivision of the Norias Division and forced Pedro Longorio, Luis Solis and Macario Longorio to feed and water their horses. A few hours after that, sometime in the morning on the Norias headquarters, the promised train from Kingsville arrived. Photographer Robert Runyon was onboard and by the time the rangers were finished being photographed with the rebels they hadn't stopped, the last of the Sediciosos crossed into Mexico. Near the Rio Grande they had run into United States Army troops and another company of Texas Rangers and lost another dozen or so men. Back at Norias, Lauro Cavazos was directed to bury the bodies, but he never made it into the photographs. When a photographer on the train snapped a photo out the window of Tom Tate and two rangers dragging the corpses out for burial Cavazos was on the ground below the train window, out of view. The postcards made from that, and other photographs, sold all through the American South and Mexico and caused a lot of outrage in northern states.

== Aftermath ==
The Americans reported that they had killed five of the Mexicans but only four appear in pictures taken of the dead on the following morning of August 9 when Hutchings and the Texas Rangers returned. However, Cavazos claimed that he was tasked with burying the bodies of ten rebels at the ranch that day and that five wounded Mexicans who were strapped to horses later died and were buried by their comrades somewhere on the ranch. Considering this and the casualties the Sediciosos suffered approaching the Rio Grande, the group which actually made it back into Mexico had suffered significant losses.

Cavazos later noticed unfamiliar tracks on the ranch and followed them to find a trespasser. The man turned out to be a bounty hunter and in his pocket Cavazos found a piece of paper with his own name on it, as well as the names of the others who defended Norias, and that of King Ranch owner Bob Kleburg and Caesar Kleberg. Written next to their names was the amount of money offered for the death of each victim. Lauro Faustino Cavazos avoided future threats and went on to work the rest of his life for the King family as a highly valued employee, becoming division manager for the Santa Gertrudis Division and raising his children in Kingsville, dying in 1958.

Thomas Rankin Tate also worked the rest of his life for the King family, staying on the Norias Division as division manager. He married Mabel Waters and raised his children there, dying in 1947. Frank Martin survived his wound and became a deputy sheriff. He was shot to death November 26, 1917 trying to bring order to a Mexican dance where things had gotten out of hand. David Portus Gay went on to become a patrol inspector of the Immigration Border Patrol in Brownsville when that was founded in 1924. He became Chief Patrol Inspector in Brownsville when the Border Patrol became a separate unit in 1926. He died in 1936. Ranger Captain Henry Ransom continued in his service in the Rangers until he was accidentally shot to death in a hotel hallway April 2, 1918 in Sweetwater, Texas.

Ranger Captain James Monroe Fox continued his service in the Rangers until the Porvenir Massacre. Though he did not participate, he was the commanding officer of the participants and invented a fiction to cover their deeds. He joined again as a captain in 1925 but resigned again when anti-ranger Texas governor Miriam Ferguson was elected. He was commissioned a Special Ranger in 1934 and discharged in 1935. He died quietly in 1937. George John Head had been a captain in the Texas National Guard, forming up an honor guard to greet William Jennings Bryan on his visit to Brownsville in 1908. A few months before the raid he resigned, then was arrested and indicted for embezzling from the Guard. On January 20 following the raid, his trial for embezzlement was set to begin in federal court. By the middle of that March he was in Tampico where he applied to the consulate for a passport, listing his occupation as "broker" and stating that he had left the United States for his own safety. He listed his occupation as "wood seller" on his draft card in 1917, and again as brokerage business on his 1919 passport. He collapsed suddenly, dying instantly in 1929.

== See also ==
- Map of the King Ranch divisions, showing the early counties
- The six uninjured cavalrymen
- Norias Division headquarters (Section house partly visible at left, bullet holes in fence post)
