= Ojo de Agua Raid =

1915 military engagement at Ojo de Aqua, Texas

Coordinates: 26.1978°N 98.4102°W

- Part of the Bandit War, Mexican Revolution
Date	October 21, 1915
Location	Ojo de Agua, Texas
Result	United States victory

Belligerents
Sediciosos	United States

Commanders and leaders
Aniceto Pizana; Luis de la Rosca	(United States) Ernest Schaeffer †

Strength
25–100 cavalry	22 cavalry 8 infantry

Casualties and losses
7 killed ~9 wounded	4 killed 8 wounded

The Ojo de Agua Raid was the last notable military engagement between Mexican Sediciosos and the United States Army. It took place at Ojo de Agua, Texas. As part of the Plan of San Diego, the rebels launched a raid across the Rio Grande into Texas on October 21, 1915, aimed at harassing the American outposts along the Mexican border and disrupting the local economy. After moving across the border, the Sediciosos began an assault against the United States Army Signal Corps station at Ojo de Agua. The small group of American defenders was cornered into a single building and suffered heavy casualties before reinforcements arrived driving the Seditionist force back into Mexico. The raid proved to be the tipping point in the American conflict with the Sediciosos, as its severity convinced American officials to send large numbers of American troops to the area in order to deter any further serious border raids by the Mexican force.

== Background ==
Throughout 1915 Mexican insurgents raided the Texas border region as part of the Plan of San Diego. Supported by the Mexican Carranza government, a group of raiders known as the Sediciosos attacked American military and commercial interests along the United States–Mexican border in an effort to provoke a race war in the Southwestern United States with aims of returning the area to Mexican control. Charged with guarding the border, American General Frederick Funston had 20,000 troops to pit against the few hundred Sedicioso insurgents. Nonetheless, the Mexicans never raided in force and the long border was difficult for Funston to fully protect. The Sedicioso raids became such a threat to the Americans in the Big Bend area that local vigilante groups were formed in order to repel the Mexican raiders as Funston did not have enough troops to ensure the safety of the American citizens living in the area.

In order to protect the Big Bend region, the United States deployed a number of cavalry and signalmen in various posts along the Texas border. One of these posts was at the village of Ojo de Agua which had been raided on September 3, 1915, and was the planned target of a Sedicioso raid in October 1916. The American base at Ojo de Agua under the command of Sergeant Ernest Schaeffer consisted of a radio station manned by approximately ten men from Troop G, 3rd Cavalry, and eight men of the United States Army Signal Corps. The post at Ojo de Agua was lightly defended and seemed to be little match for the 25 to 100 raiders that planned to raid the village.

== Raid ==
After crossing the Rio Grande and arriving at Ojo de Agua at approximately 1 am, the Mexican raiders attacked the village's garrison. The U.S. soldiers who had been sleeping in a wooden building stubbornly resisted. The soldiers were heavily outgunned, though, as the signalmen were armed only with pistols. Sergeant Schaeffer was killed and command devolved to Sergeant First Class Herbert Reeves Smith who by that time had been wounded three times. In addition to attacking the garrison, the raiders robbed the post office and attacked the home of the Dillard family, setting their house on fire and stealing their livestock.

Although the U.S. troops at Ojo de Agua were unable to call for reinforcements because their wireless station had been disabled, U.S. detachments in the vicinity heard gunfire and two groups of American cavalry set out to investigate. A company from the 3rd Cavalry under Captain Frank Ross McCoy at Mission, Texas some 8 miles (13 km) from Ojo de Agua was dispatched, as was a small group of twelve recruits under Captain W. J. Scott. Scott's outfit was only 2 miles (3.2 km) from the fighting and arrived at the scene well before McCoy. They immediately attacked from the west of the raiders' positions, driving them off. McCoy's force arrived just as the Mexicans withdrew and saw little or no fighting.

== Aftermath ==
By the end of the raid one civilian and three U.S. soldiers, including commanding officer Sergeant Schaffer, had been killed and eight wounded. The Sediciosos lost five men dead and at least nine others wounded, two of whom later died. A Japanese man and two Carrancista soldiers were found among the dead which was seen as evidence that the Carrancistas had been supporting the Plan of San Diego. The U.S. soldiers were commended for their bravery during the raid, and Sergeant Smith was awarded a Distinguished Service Cross for his actions during the engagement.

The Sedicioso raid on Ojo de Agua impacted American military strategy in the area. The commanding U.S. general in the region, General Frederick Funston, reinforced the border region with troops and requested to be allowed to give no quarter to any Mexican raiders who attacked the United States in the future. General Funston's request was denied and the raids came to an end when Washington recognized the Mexican government under Carranza. Wishing to maintain good relations with the United States, Carranza ordered the Sedicioso commanders to cease their raiding activities. Without support from the Mexican federal government the Plan of San Diego movement fell apart and there were no further Mexican invasions of the United States until the Villistas raids began in 1916.

== See also ==
- Attacks on the United States
