= Canales Investigation =

1919 legislative hearing into criminal conduct of the Texas Rangers

The Canales Investigation was a 1919 legislative hearing into criminal conduct of the Texas Rangers, named for Texas State Representative José Tomás (J.T.) Canales. The purpose of the hearing was to "investigate the activities and necessity for a continuance of the force." The investigations surfaced several allegations of wrongdoing, from murder to intimidation charges, with varying degrees of evidence. The committee absolved the Texas Rangers of all legal wrongdoing while acknowledging a track record of abuse, and commended the adjutant general of the Texas Rangers. Nonetheless, the investigation sparked internal reform of the Texas Rangers aimed to increase professionalism and accountability.

== Background ==
The 1910 Mexican Revolution had raised tensions along the border of Texas and Mexico. Immigration into the southern US states from Mexico rose, with nearly one million Mexicans entering the United States at the turn of the century. Land redistribution efforts in Mexico made Anglo-Americans nervous about disputed land claims between the United States and Mexico. This tension, mixed with fears that Mexico would side with Germany in the first World War, created extraordinary tension on the border.

Texas Governor James E. Ferguson nearly doubled the size of the ranger force, from 13 to 24 men, from 1913 to 1916. With rumors of an organized insurrection and word of the Mexican insurrectionist Plan de San Diego spread, the governor declared a punishment of execution of insurrectionists. The Texas Rangers thus began a campaign of racial profiling and ethnic violence against Mexicans in Texas. One Texas judge, James Wells, estimated in later testimony that Texas officers and vigilantes were responsible for the executions of up to 300 Mexican men in just two counties. The Texas Rangers and hundreds of other temporary military police known as "Loyalty Rangers" may have killed between 300 and 5,000 Mexican and Tejano men through 1919. Widespread claims of abuse of authority and vigilantism would spark the investigation of the Texas Rangers by Jose Tomas Canales in 1919.

=== House Bill 5 ===
Representative José Tomás Canales, the only Hispanic state lawmaker in Texas at the time, introduced legislation to regulate Ranger activity after he had been threatened by a Ranger, Frank Hamer, in the course of an investigation. Canales wrote a formal letter to Texas Governor William P. Hobby, who promised an investigation. Hamer was forced to apologize but was not removed.

After the incident, Canales introduced legislation, House Bill 5, which would, among other measures, limit the number of Texas Rangers to 24 officers, increase pay and professionalism (with requirements for age and prior service). It also called for Rangers to hand over prisoners to local authorities immediately, rather than detain them. Discussion of the bill inspired heated and emotional rhetoric in defense of the Rangers, with Canales making charges that the group was responsible for the abuse of prisoners and a number of murders.

During the debate, Adjutant General James A. Harley intervened to request an investigation into the "motives that actuate men to make complaint" and intended an investigation into Canales and those who were perceived as impugning the reputation of the Ranger Force but also to articulate a final argument in defense of the force's existence.

== Charges ==
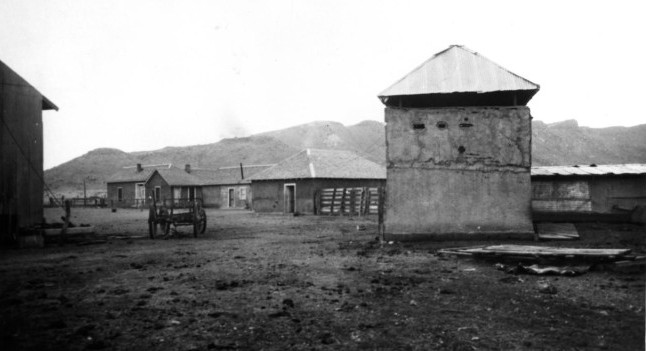
Photograph of Brite Ranch, near Marfa, Texas, circa 1918, shows the ranch headquarters complex and a small two story fort (at right) built for Texas Rangers to protect against Mexican raiders

The hearings, which convened on January 31, 1919, were formally "The Joint Committee of the Senate and the House in the Investigation of the Texas Ranger Force." It included two state senators and three state representatives, and was chaired by Lubbock representative W.H. Bledsoe. The panel heard from 80 witnesses over 12 days of testimony amounting to 1,605 printed pages.

The defense, on the side of the Rangers, was represented by former legislator Robert E. Lee Knight and Texas Cattle Ranchers Association Attorney Dayton Moses. The defense focused on the mental health of Canales, arguing that he suffered delusions. Canales, on the offense, introduced six charges, which would swell to 19 charges, many of which were vague and worded in ways that would be impossible to prove. Canales proposed that support for the Texas Rangers was a result of German propaganda, designed to inflame tensions against Mexico to distract the United States from entering World War I.

Many witnesses testified with both acknowledgment and ambivalence to the Rangers' acts of violence. One, Judge James B. Wells, testified both that he believed Rangers were responsible for a mass murder of 11 Mexican men whose corpses he had personally discovered on the side of the road in a state of decay. Nonetheless, he testified, "I thought it was my duty and I never took a cent of compensation. Defended several for murder."

=== Massacre ===
The Porvenir massacre was an incident on January 28, 1918, in Presidio County, Texas in which the Rangers and local ranchers killed 15 Mexican villagers. The Texas Rangers Company B was sent to the area to stop banditry after the Brite Ranch raid. However, despite having no evidence that the Porvenir villagers were involved, witnesses testified that “American soldiers, Rangers, and Texas Ranchmen” executed fifteen men. Porvenir resident Rosenda Mega testified that the Rangers "took them about one-quarter of a mile from said ranch, and then in a very cowardly manner, and without examining any of them, shot them.”

=== Murder ===
Canales highlighted the murder of Lisandro Muñoz and the disappearance of Florencio Garcia. Canales had brought the murder of Lisandro Muñoz to the committee, charging that Ranger John J. Edds had murdered Muñoz on October 6, 1918. Edds admitted he had entered the home of a deserter without a warrant, and that he was overpowered by Muñoz, arguing that the murder was in self-defense. Regarding Florencio Garcia, two rangers had taken Garcia into custody for a theft investigation. The next day they let Garcia go, and were last seen escorting him on a mule. Garcia was never seen again. A month after the interrogation, bones and Garcia's clothing were found beside the road where the Rangers claimed to have let Garcia go. The Rangers were arrested for murder, freed on bail, and acquitted due to lack of evidence.

Another murder investigation lead one Ranger to confess to collecting $10 a week from brothels and bars, on order of the city marshal. The case had been addressed but the charges previously dismissed as lacking evidence. The Ranger resigned.

During the trial, two rangers became intoxicated and shot each other during a poker game with four other rangers and two women, resulting in one fatality. The officers were all discharged, and the committee decided it would not invite witnesses to testify or hear further details of the incident.

=== Intimidation ===
The counsel also heard the testimony of Jesus Villareal, who testified that two Rangers had pistol-whipped him, suffocated him, put a gun into his mouth and planned to plant evidence unless he confessed to the crime of transporting Mexican immigrants across the border. Canales acknowledged he had no further evidence for this charge aside from the testimony.

Another Ranger admitted to pistol-whipping an attorney in a courtroom in Falfurrias, while testimony of waitstaff from the San Francisco Cafe in San Antonio suggested that a Ranger had pistol-whipped a waiter. Canales acknowledged that the Ranger had been dismissed, but suggested that evidence had been tampered with to suggest he had been dismissed prior to the incident with the waiter.

Canales also argued that he had anonymous testimony from dozens of claimants, whom he would not reveal, who claimed that they had not brought charges against Rangers for known misbehavior because they had no faith that the crimes would not simply be covered up. Canales argued mostly of his own experience being threatened by Hamer, and argued that Hamer should have been dismissed for threatening an elected official, rather than simply asked to apologize. The committee had little concern with Hamer's behavior, and openly mocked Canales, asking whether Hamer "should go into hiding" whenever Canales came to Austin.

=== Leadership failures ===
Canales argued that repeated Ranger violations of state statutes under Harley were cause for Harley's dismissal and replacement. The committee ruled that this was beyond the scope of their investigation. Harley responded to Canales' allegation with a vulgar statement accusing Canales' of trying to sodomize the Rangers. The charge was dismissed.

== Conclusions ==
The committee disbanded on February 13. On February 18, it issued a verdict absolving the Rangers of wrongdoing and suggested the force be allowed to continue, despite supporting the claim that Garcia had been murdered by agents, and other evidence of "gross violation of both civil and criminal laws.” It argued that the Rangers had violated the laws in searching homes without warrants and that it had illegally seized firearms. Nonetheless, it offered praise to General Harley, head of the Ranger Force, declaring him "entitled to the commendation of the Senate and House for the able, efficient, impartial, and fearless manner in which he has discharged the duties placed upon him." The committee backed Canales' bill, calling for a reduction of the force and higher pay.

The House scratched Canales' proposal in favor of a new bill which raised pay, set a cap of 75 Rangers, and otherwise reinforced existing laws; it passed 87–10 with Canales in the minority opposition. Nonetheless, the bill was collectively referred to as "the Canales reforms," though they bore little resemblance to Canales' proposal.

== Reforms ==
The so-called Canales Reforms introduced a smaller force with higher pay standards and a minimum and maximum age requirement for Rangers. It opened a process for filing formal complaints against Ranger misdeeds, which would be directed to the adjutant general of the Rangers; this was a formalization of the process that had already existed. The Rangers were reorganized into four companies of 16 Rangers, each with one captain, and one headquarters with six men and a captain.

Internally, the Rangers voluntarily adopted increased bureaucracy, requiring daily scout reports and identification badges. A code of conduct was introduced, forbidding drinking, gambling, obscene language and public criticism of fellow Rangers; guns could be worn but were to be hidden in public areas when off duty.

== See also ==
- Bandit Wars
- La Matanza
- Lynching in the United States
- Nadir of American race relations
