= La Matanza (1910–1920) =

1910–1920 period of anti-Mexican violence in Texas

La Matanza ("The Massacre" or "The Slaughter") and the Hora de Sangre ("Hour of Blood") was a period of anti-Mexican violence in Texas, including massacres and lynchings, between 1910 and 1920 in the midst of tensions between the United States and Mexico during the Mexican Revolution. This violence was committed by Anglo-Texan vigilantes, and law enforcement, such as the Texas Rangers, during operations against bandit raids known as the Bandit Wars. The violence and denial of civil liberties during this period was justified by racism. Ranger violence reached its peak from 1915 to 1919, in response to increasing conflict, initially because of the Plan de San Diego, by Mexican and Tejano insurgents to take Texas. This period was referred to as the Hora de Sangre by Mexicans in South Texas, many of whom fled to Mexico to escape the violence. Estimates for the number of Mexican Americans killed in the violence in Texas during the 1910s, ranges from 300 to 5,000 killed. At least 100 Mexican Americans were lynched in the 1910s, many in Texas. Many murders were concealed and went unreported, with some in South Texas, suspected by Rangers of supporting rebels, being placed on blacklists and often "disappearing".

== Mexican Revolution ==
The Mexican Revolution started in 1910. Mexican refugees, looking to escape the violence of the revolution, began migrating to Texas, causing the Mexican population in the U.S. to triple during the 1910s. The revolution also caused outbursts of violence along the Texas–Mexico border, including raiding by bandits from Mexico and retaliatory counter-raids by Americans. Prior to 1914, the Carrancistas were responsible for most attacks along the border, but in January 1915 rebels known as Seditionistas drafted the Plan of San Diego and began launching their own raids. The plan called for a race war to rid the American border states of their Anglo-American population and for Mexico to annex the states. They never launched a full-scale invasion of the United States, resorting to conducting small raids into Texas. Much of the fighting involved the Texas Ranger Division, although the United States Army also engaged in small unit actions with bands of Seditionista raiders. Mexican rebels from the states of Tamaulipas, Coahuila, and Chihuahua carried out a series of raids called the Bandit War in Texas, beginning in 1914 and culminating in 1919. Americans in the Lower Rio Grande Valley feared losing both their land and control over their country. The growing Mexican population in Texas further contributed to the threat of the revolution. Tensions between Mexico and the United States eventually led to violence between white Americans and Mexicans, and the lynching of Mexican ethnics.

== Beginning cases ==
=== Antonio Rodríguez ===
Antonio Rodriguez was the first victim who died due to La Matanza in 1910. He was a 20-year-old migrant worker who had moved from Mexico to Rocksprings, Texas, in search of work. On November 2, he was accused of murdering a white Texan, arrested, and jailed. On November 3, 1910, a mob took him from his jail cell and burned him alive. An investigation by Mexican officials took place, but it was inconclusive. When news of the lynching reached Guadalajara, Mexico, Rodriguez's hometown, the residents of the town staged protests, demanding further investigation into the death of Rodriguez, the arrest of his lynchers, and more protection for Mexicans in the U.S.

=== Antonio Gomez ===
Antonio Gomez was a fourteen-year-old Mexican boy from Thorndale, Texas. On June 19, 1911, while trying to escape from a mob that encircled him, he killed a German man named Charles Zieschang. He was immediately arrested and taken to the town jailhouse. Anticipating that mob would take Gomez out of his jail cell and lynch him, the constable of the town made plans to transport him to the county jail in Cameron, Texas. While the boy was being transported, a mob of four men intercepted two men, who were transporting the boy, and Gomez. They captured Gomez, lynching him successfully after a failed attempt in the light of the day. The following morning, a mob drove Gomez's family away from the town with death threats. Two witnesses to the lynching later identified the four men who lynched Gomez, who were arrested.

=== León Martínez Jr. ===
León Martínez Jr.'s execution was justified with the law, classified as a legal hanging. Such executions or legal hangings are still classified as part of the total of 571 lynchings of Mexican Americans that occurred between 1848 and 1928. He lived in Toyah, Texas, with his family. On July 23, 1911, he was accused of murdering a young white woman, with the testimony of multiple witnesses. On two separate occasions, he confessed to the crime under force, first to a mob, and then to a sheriff who arrested him. On July 28, 1911, Martinez was tried for murder. The following day, a jury found him guilty, and he was sentenced to death. Because Martinez's attorneys, who were proceeding to file an appeal, were obstructed by a mob, the county judge ruled that Martinez was to be hanged on September 1. Governor of Texas Oscar Branch Colquitt postponed the execution for 30 days due to outrage from across the nation. On November 3, 1911, the Texas Court of Criminal Appeals ruled in favor of a new trial. A trial in the Supreme Court was proposed, but the Supreme Court rejected the case, citing its lack of jurisdiction. Multiple pleas from various people were sent to Colquitt to pardon Martinez, but he did not. On May 11, 1914, Martinez was executed legally by hanging.

== Plan of San Diego ==
The Plan of San Diego was drafted in 1915 by Mexican rebels. It involved Mexicans, Native Americans, and African Americans taking land from the white population by the Mexican, Native American, and African-American ethnicities in a series of raids and attacks. The territories that they planned to invade were Texas, New Mexico, Colorado, Arizona, and California. It also included the killing of all white males over the age of 16 years. Although the rebels were never able to launch a full-scale invasion of the lands that they demanded, they were able to conduct a series of raids targeted at Anglo Americans. In total, 30 raids into Texas destroyed large amounts of property and killed 21 Americans. In turn, the Plan of San Diego further increased the prevalence of anti-Mexican sentiment during La Matanza. About 400 Anglo-Texans were killed total in unrest and attacks along the border during the 1910s, and much property was destroyed.

== Hora de Sangre (1915–1919) ==
During the period from August 1915 to June 1916 alone, anywhere from 100 to 300 murders of Mexicans were recorded. Many murders went unreported. This indiscriminate murder of Mexicans, particularly in South Texas, caused many to flee to Mexico. This exodus was reportedly so widespread that "farmers raised concerns because their field laborers were fleeing to Mexico." One farmer said that the workforce had "evaporated" in a very short period. Even Mexican landowners fled to Mexico and in some cases left thousands of cattle behind because of their urgency. The majority of this violence was carried out by the state through the Texas Ranger Division. During this period, an Anglo recalled "all the Rangers had to was get a suspicion on somebody, any little thing, and they would take 'em out and shoot 'em down."

== Texas Rangers ==
During the Mexican Revolution, the Texas Rangers were known for violence against Mexicans, including American residents of Mexican origin. Their anti-Mexican sentiment was fueled by the ongoing revolution and the Plan of San Diego. The Mexican population, which knew the Rangers for brutality, gave them the name "los diablos tejanos", which means "the Texan devils". Many accounts of the Rangers' violence were recorded throughout La Matanza. The organization occasionally worked with white vigilantes. They were legally supported by the Texas Legislature.

=== Jesus Bazan and Antonio Longoria ===
Jesus Bazan (1848–1915) and Antonio Longoria (1866–1915) were two well-known Mexican-American residents of South Texas. Despite their prominent status, the two men were victims of violence against Mexican Americans. In September 1915, armed robbers stole the horses of Jesus Bazan and Antonio Longoria along with some of their supplies. On September 27, the two men reported the incident to Henry Ransom. Ransom, who was a member of the Rangers, chased them after they finished describing the robbery to him and shot both of them, killing them. After the murder, Ransom ordered his fellow Rangers not to move the bodies of the two men to spread fear. In October, several friends of Longoria and other locals finally buried the two bodies. No official investigation into the killings took place, and Ransom did not inform higher authorities of the incident. The justice of the peace did not release death certificates.

=== Porvenir massacre ===
Early in the morning of January 28, 1918, Company B of the Texas Rangers and four cattle ranchers, led by Captain James Monroe Fox, surrounded the village of Porvenir in Presidio County, Texas. With the help of the 8th Cavalry Regiment, the Rangers and the cavalry woke up the residents of Porvenir at around 2:00 A.M. and brought them out of their homes. They took the 15 men and older boys of the village. Captain Fox dismissed the cavalry unit after the residents were gathered, and several Rangers probed the residents' homes for weapons. After the cavalry left, the Rangers proceeded to bind the 15 men with ropes and fired at them, killing all of them while they stood three feet away. They continued to fire until they ran out of bullets. Hearing sounds of the massacre, the 8th Cavalry Regiment went back to the town to investigate the commotion, witnessing the aftermath of the massacre.

=== Canales investigation ===
The Canales investigation was an inquiry into the violent actions of the Texas Rangers and state police against Mexican Americans. It began in January 1919, and was presented and sponsored by State Representative Jose Canales, who sought to publicize the actions of the Texas Rangers. Throughout the investigation, Canales gathered evidence and testimony from witnesses that exemplified the violence committed by the Texas Rangers toward Mexican ethnics. When the investigation went to trial, Canales brought 19 charges against the Texas Rangers with his evidence and witnesses. The charges were ultimately dropped.

== Aftermath ==
Shortly after this period, Mexican laborers had to be imported from Mexico in order to service white farmers because the violence had caused so many Mexican people to flee the country. Some 50,000 Mexican laborers were imported into the US by 1920. This was deemed even more urgent in Texas since "Black labor had moved to the cities," and therefore there was a constant demand for Mexican labor. Despite the fact that some Anglos still demonstrated their racism, with signs stating "Keep out the Mongrel Mexicans" and to "Lock the Back Door" because they perceived Mexicans as "the most undesirable of all peoples," Mexican labor was cheap for Anglos and they were in desperate need of it. However, as soon as Mexicans started to organize and attempt to form unions in the early 20th century, they were faced with massive deportations such as the Mexican Repatriation (1929–1936) as well as everyday harassment.

According to CNN, descendants of victims of La Matanza predicted as early as July 2019 that anti-immigrant sentiment could lead to violence, such as that in the 2019 El Paso shooting, where 22 people were killed and 24 injured in an El Paso Walmart.

== See also ==
- Bandit War
