= Bandit War =

1910–1918 Mexican rebel raids into Texas, USA

- Part of the Mexican Border War and U.S. intervention in the Mexican Revolution
Date	July 4, 1915 – August 23, 1919 (4 years, 1 month, 2 weeks and 5 days)
Location	Texas, United States
Result	United States victory

Belligerents
United States	Seditionistas; Carrancistas

Commanders and leaders
Frederick Funston	Basilio Ramos; Luis de la Rosca; Aniceto Pizana; Natividad Álvarez; Rodríguez Ramírez

Casualties and losses
Unknown	300
- Civilians: Unknown but believed to be above 350

The Bandit War, or Bandit Wars, was a series of raids in Texas that started in 1915 and finally culminated in 1919. They were carried out by Mexican rebels from the states of Tamaulipas, Coahuila, and Chihuahua. Prior to 1914, the Carrancistas had been responsible for most attacks along the border, but in January 1915, rebels known as "Sedicionistas" drafted the Plan of San Diego and began launching their own raids. The plan called for a race war to rid the American border states of their Anglo-American population and for the annexation of the border states to Mexico. However, the "Sedicionistas" could never launch a full-scale invasion of the United States and so the faction resorted to conducting small raids into Texas. Much of the fighting involved the Texas Ranger Division, but the US Army also engaged in small unit actions with bands of Seditionist raiders.

== Seditionista campaign ==
The height of the fighting was in 1915. On January 6, Basilio Ramos and a group of his followers drafted the Plan of San Diego in San Diego, Texas, to try to bring the American border states under the rule of Mexican President Venustiano Carranza. Calling themselves the Seditionistas, the rebels began attacking small American outposts and settlements along the Rio Grande, many of which were guarded by US Army soldiers. The first attack took place on July 4, 1915, when a band of approximately 40 mounted rebels crossed the border and raided Los Indios Ranch in Cameron County. The first bloodshed did not occur until five days later, however, on July 9, when an employee of the King Ranch killed one of the raiders near the Norias Ranch. On July 11, two Mexican-American police officers were shot from a distance near Brownsville, both died. American authorities said that "the Mexican officers knew of the plans [Plan of San Diego] of their fellows before the real beginning of the operations and that this was the cause of the several efforts to assassinate them." Over the next two weeks, there were various reports of raids, attacks on police officers, and assassination attempts on local landowners. By the end of July, the raiders were trying to cut off communications to the people in the Lower Rio Grande Valley and disrupt railroad transportation. On July 25, they burned a bridge belonging to the St. Louis, Brownsville and Mexico Railway and then cut some telegraph wires near Harlingen. A few days after that, the Governor of Texas, James E. Ferguson, sent the Texas Ranger Captain Harry Ransom into the Lower Rio Grande Valley to lead a "pacification campaign." According to author John William Weber, Ransom was in charge of an "assassination squad" that conducted a "scorched-earth campaign of annihilation" against both guilty and innocent Mexicans.

Some people suspected that the current fighting would ignite a full-fledged war between the United States and Mexico. One South Texan wrote, "I have never been satisfied with the Alamo and Goliad events, and always have felt that there was something yet due the Mexicans from us, and if there is a second call and for a war, the Mexicans will certainly get what is due them from the Texans." On July 29, a Mexican, Adolfo Munoz, was killed near San Benito for "scheming to rob a local bank and having connections with armed raiders." Cameron County Deputy Sheriff Frank Carr and the Texas Ranger Daniel Hinojosa arrested Munoz but according to the officers, when they were leaving San Benito, a party of eight armed men wearing masks forced them to give up Munoz. The next day, Munoz's body was found about two miles from town and had been "riddled with bullets" and hanging from a tree. The lynching, whether perpetrated by the rebels or by the Texans, created an atmosphere of distrust among the local Mexican population for the Texas Rangers and other American police forces. José Tomás Canales said that "every person who was charged with a crime refused to be arrested, because they did not believe that the officers of the law would give them the protection guaranteed them by the Constitution and the laws of this State." A lawyer in San Benito, William G. B. Morrison, said that Munoz's lynching had been "the spark that fired the flame among the white people." However, a federal investigator said that the lynching had been "an expression of the indignation of the people against the repeated failure to enforce the laws."

John William Weber considers that "personal conflict" was the cause of some of the violence and that the "most important example" was that of Aniceto Pizana, the owner of Los Tulitos Ranch. Pizana's neighbor, Jeff Scrivener, was known for wanting Pizana's land and so in early August, he told American authorities that Pizana was in league with the rebels and had harbored some of them during one of their raids. Despite that accusation, no evidence suggests that Pizana ever had any significant ties with the rebels though he was a friend of Luis de la Rosca, a known raider who owned a store in Rio Hondo. In response to Scrivener's claim, a force of about 30 Texas Rangers, US Army soldiers, and some deputy sheriffs attacked the Los Tulitos Ranch on August 3. During the gunfight that followed, one soldier was killed, and three other people were wounded, including two deputy sheriffs and Pizana's son. Pizana himself got away and, according to Weber, joined up with Luis de la Rosca after the attack on his ranch. From then on, Rosca and Pizana became the "primary military leaders of the Plan [of San Diego]." On August 6, Luis de la Rosca led a raid on the town of Sebastian, killing A. L. Austin and his son Charles. Austin formerly served as the president of the Law and Order League which, according to federal investigators, "had driven several bad men out of that section [Sebastian, Texas]" and so was an ideal target for the raiders, who thought of him as a racist. Within the next few days after the deaths of the Austins, several local Mexicans were killed by either the Texas Rangers or vigilantes. A posse led by the Texas adjudant general, Henry Hutchings, and Captain Ransom killed three people alone. Meanwhile, the rebels were destroying railroad property by ripping up tracks, burning bridges, and attacking the repairmen who were sent to fix the problems.

The "most daring" raid during the Seditionistas' campaign occurred at the Norias Ranch, the headquarters for the southernmost division of the King Ranch. On the night of August 8, somewhere between 45 and 70 rebels attacked Norias, which was defended by a squad of American cavalrymen, a few policemen and a few ranchers. During the two-hour battle that followed, at least a dozen people were killed or wounded and possibly many more before the rebels retreated back towards Mexico. Another battle was fought on the next morning, when the Mexican raiders encountered a force of Texas Rangers and soldiers as they attempted to cross the Rio Grande. The Americans reported that as many as twelve more rebels were killed and that very few made it across the river. For the next few weeks, West Texas was plagued by "almost daily killings," the most notable of which occurred on October 19. That day, a band of raiders derailed a train six miles north of Brownsville and killed several white people on board but left the Mexican passengers unhurt. When Captain Ransom arrived at the scene he found four Mexicans in the vicinity and executed them all. On October 21, Rosca and Pizana led 25 to 100 rebels in the last important raid of the Seditionista campaign. Like most of the raids, it was a failure for the rebels. This time, a squad of eight army signalmen was besieged by the Mexicans at Ojo de Agua until it was relieved by 12 men from the 3rd Cavalry, under Captain W. J. Scott. At least seven rebels died as result of the battle and at least seven others were wounded. The Americans suffered one civilian death, three soldiers killed, and eight wounded.

By December 1915, the threat of Mexican raiders was slowly diminishing, but in the summer of 1916, a series of minor attacks began, all them occurring around Laredo, Texas. That year, Luis de la Rosca recruited his Villista cousin Jose Morin to capture San Antonio, but a baker in Kingsville, known as Victoriano Ponce, informed the Texas Rangers, who arrested both men in May. The two were apparently murdered by the Rangers since they were never seen again after their arrest. According to US Army investigators, over 300 Mexicans had been killed during the Seditionistas' campaign.

== See also ==
- Battle of Salado Creek (1842)
- Crabb massacre (1857)
- Crawford affair (1886)
- Las Cuevas War (1875)
- Garza Revolution (1891-93)
- La Matanza (1910–1920)
