= Porvenir massacre (1918) =

1918 shooting in Texas, US

- Part of the Bandit War, Mexican Revolution
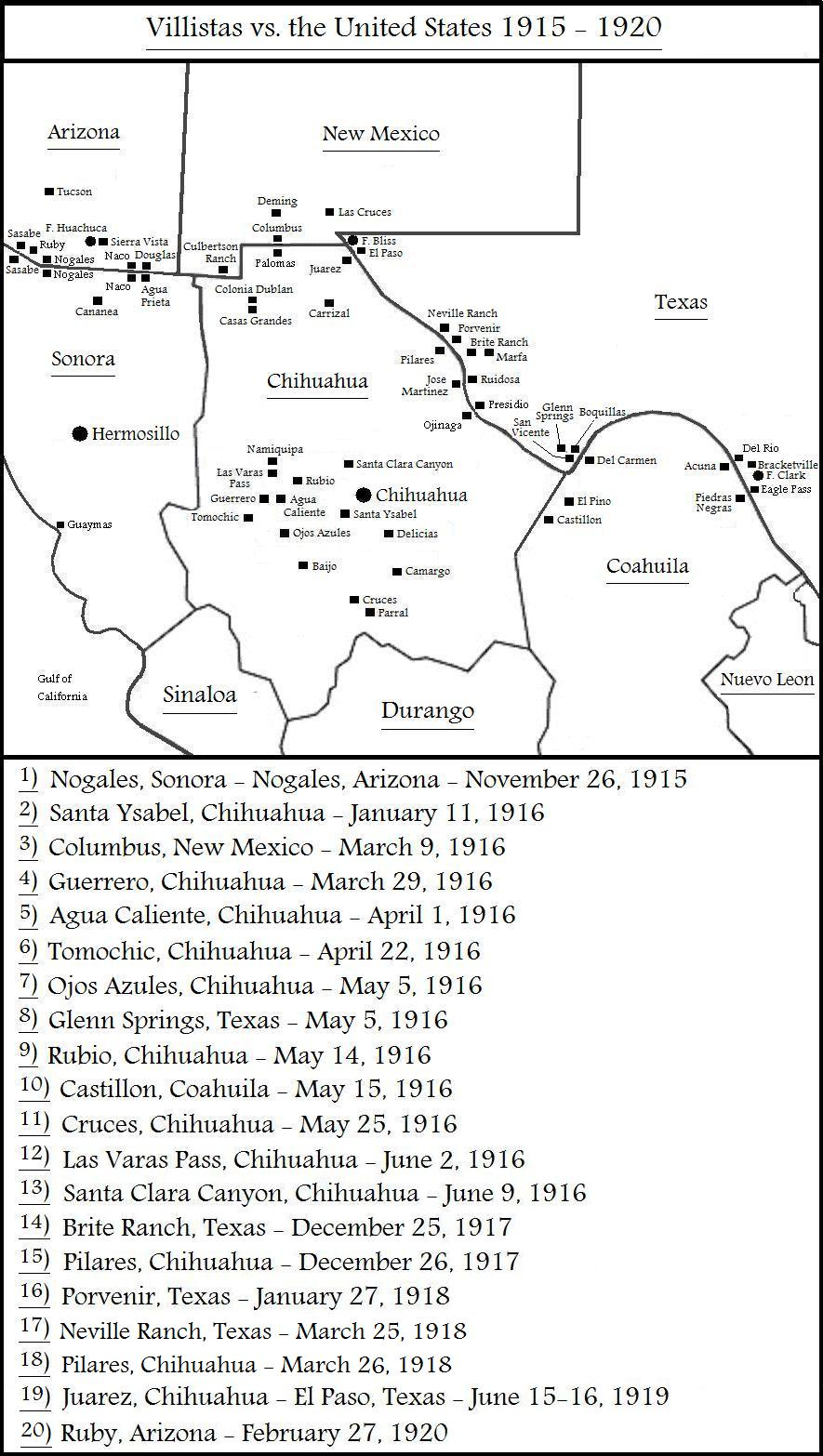
- Location: 30°25′7″N 104°50′40″W; Porvenir, Presidio County, Texas
- Date: January 28, 1918
- Weapon: Small arms
- Deaths: 15
- Perpetrators: Company B, Texas Rangers; Troop G, 8th Cavalry Regiment; local ranchers
- Motive: Retaliation for Brite Ranch raid

The Porvenir massacre was an incident on January 28, 1918, outside the village of Porvenir, in Presidio County, Texas, in which Texas Rangers and local ranchers, with the support of US Cavalry, killed 15 unarmed Mexican American boys and men. The Texas Rangers Company B had been sent to the area to stop banditry after the Brite Ranch raid. Despite having no evidence that the Porvenir villagers had been involved in recent thefts or the killings of ranchers, the Rangers separated 15 men and boys from the rest of the village and shot them on a nearby hill.

== Background ==
As the Mexican Revolution had an increasing effect on Americans living near the border, anti-Mexican sentiment became more prevalent in the 1910s. Revolutionaries attacked farms, irrigation systems, and railroads. After Pancho Villa's Villistas led raids into the United States, most notably in the Battle of Columbus in 1916, federal, state, and local authorities took greater action to stop raids in the border region. Many Texas Rangers, including Company B, were ordered to secure the areas near the border and to stop raids by bandits, Villistas, and Anglo-Americans trying to provoke conflict with Mexico.

Another factor that aroused anti-Mexican sentiment was the emergence in 1915 of the Plan de San Diego. It was a manifesto by two Texas Mexicans which attempted to create an uprising against Anglo-American settlers in the lands acquired by the US in the Treaty of Guadalupe Hidalgo after the Mexican–American War. Although unsuccessful, the Plan de San Diego spurred fears of more violence in the border states, in addition to banditry and the encroaching Mexican civil war.

The Brite Ranch raid took place on Christmas Day, December 25, 1917, in Presidio County. The mail hack driver was hanged in the store, and his throat was slit. His two Mexican passengers were shot and killed, and the ranch foreman was injured. The bandits stole thousands of dollars' worth of goods from the store and horses before they fled toward Mexico. The US Cavalry responded by chasing the suspected Villistas into Mexico.

== Incident ==
On January 26, 1918, Texas Rangers Company B, under the command of Captain James Monroe Fox, entered and searched the homes of villagers in Porvenir after suspecting involvement in the Brite Ranch raid a month before. During the search, the Rangers found only two weapons: a pistol belonging to an Anglo-American man in the village, and a Winchester rifle belonging to a Tejano villager. Both weapons were confiscated, and three Tejano men were arrested and taken and detained at the Ranger camp. The men were released the next day. Shortly after two of the men returned to Porvenir, the Rangers reentered the settlement in the early hours of January 28, taking everyone out of their homes. In addition to the ten Rangers, eight US Army Cavalry and four local Anglo-American ranchers (John Pool, Buck Pool, Raymond Fitzgerald and Tom Snyder) were present at the village.

A total of 15 males, two boys and the remainder of the men, all ethnic Mexicans, were separated from the women, other children, and Anglo-Americans in the village. The Texas Rangers and ranchers led the men and boys outside the village to a nearby hill, reportedly leaving the US Army Cavalry soldiers closer to the village. Shortly after, the party of Rangers and ranchers shot and killed all fifteen men and boys.

They left the bodies of the dead where they were shot. The next day, the son of one of the men killed, 12-year old Juan Bonilla Flores, went with Anglo-American schoolteacher Henry Warren (married to the daughter of massacre victim Tiburcio Jáquez) to the site and discovered the bodies. The remaining 140 villagers abandoned Porvenir. Many moved across the border to Presidio de Pilares, Chihuahua, where they buried the deceased. The uninhabited village was razed by US Army soldiers in the days following the massacre.

== Victims ==
The list of victims was documented by Henry Warren:

1. Manuel Moralez, 47, who possessed a deed to 1,600 acres. His sixth child was born that night.
2. Román Nieves, 48, who possessed a deed to 320 acres
3. Longino Flores, 44, father of Juan Flores
4. Alberto García, 35
5. Eutimio González, 37
6. Macedonio Huertas, 30
7. Tiburcio Jáquez, 50
8. Ambrosio Hernández, 21
9. Antonio Castañeda, 72
10. Pedro Herrera, 25
11. Viviano Herrera, 23
12. Severiano Herrera, 15
13. Pedro Jiménez, 25
14. Serapio Jiménez, 25
15. Juan Jiménez, 16

The men killed were survived by a combined forty-two children.

== Aftermath ==
The first mention of the incident was in the Houston Post on February 8. The massacre was characterized in the paper as "trouble with a band of Mexicans...supposed to have been implicated in the Brite raid ranch." The paper did report that the U.S. State Department, at the urging of Mexican Ambassador Ignacio Bonillas, had ordered an investigation, tasking the military in the Big Bend District to conduct it. The El Paso Herald on that same day reported that the Mexican men killed were all wearing clothing from the Brite Ranch store; this was countered by acting Mexican Counsel General Ruiz Sandoval, who noted that everyone in the region bought clothes from Brite Ranch.

The incident was not formally reported to Ranger command for nearly a month. Captain Fox of the Rangers reported that the 15 Mexican villagers had ambushed the Rangers, and that stolen property from the Brite Ranch was found on the bodies of the villagers. Captain Anderson of the US Cavalry and Henry Warren gave a differing account of the massacre, stating the Rangers and ranchers had executed the men, and that the US Cavalry was not involved in the killings.

It is largely unknown whether retaliatory action against Anglo-Americans by Mexicans occurred following the Porvenir massacre. One instance of possible retaliation was the Neville Ranch raid. On March 25, two months after the Porvenir massacre, a rancher and a female Mexican servant were killed by raiders at nearby Neville Ranch. The servant was raped, shot, and mutilated. As not much was stolen during the raid, it was suspected that the Neville Ranch killings were retaliation by Villistas for the Porvenir massacre.

== Investigations ==
An investigation was launched by the Texas Rangers Command and headed by Captain William M. Hanson. The investigation used affidavits from several widows of the victims, all having Henry Warren serving as their attorney. Along with a statement from Warren claiming the dead were all farmers, and none bandits, the investigation concluded that Company B was to be tried for the killings. None of the Rangers were found guilty by a grand jury, but five were dismissed by Texas Governor William P. Hobby. The remainder, including Captain Fox, were reassigned. Company B was disbanded. The investigation concluded that the US Cavalry were not directly involved in the killings.

The Porvenir Ranger investigation was concluded in June 1918, shortly before Texas State Representative José Tomás Canales launched a broader investigation into misconduct by the Rangers throughout Texas. The 1919 joint Senate–House investigation concluded that the Texas Rangers had committed many atrocities and extrajudicial killings, particularly of ethnic Mexicans. The investigation estimated that from 1914 to 1919, between 300 and 5,000 ethnic Mexicans died in the violence. Charges were filed against many Rangers and the department was reduced in size. Additionally, Canales required administrative changes within the Texas Ranger Division, including much stricter recruitment criteria and higher pay for qualifying Rangers. The investigation largely ended the mass violence by law enforcement against Mexicans and instituted a new level of professionalism within the Rangers.

=== Archaeological investigation ===
In 2015, archaeological research at the site of the killings turned up bullets and casings likely to have been fired by US Cavalry standard-issue weapons. In 2002, Juan Flores identified the site where his father and 14 others were killed. One of the team's archaeologists, David Keller, said, "I can say with a fair degree of confidence that the artifactual distribution, the types of artifacts, all strongly conform to the hypothesis that this was the site of the Porvenir Massacre of 1918. The findings also strongly implicate the U.S. Cavalry."

== Representation in other media ==
Texas-based film filmmaker Andrew Shapter produced and directed Porvenir, Texas, a feature-length documentary film about the massacre. It features new and archival footage of interviews and archaeological digs. It was scheduled to be shown on PBS in March 2018.

Shapter also began production in mid-2018 as director of Porvenir, a feature-length historical drama about the massacre.

Porvenir massacre
- Interactive map of Porvenir massacre
- Location: US 90 near Valentine, Texas
- Coordinates: 30°30′34″N 104°50′40″W
- Type: historical marker
- Width: 27 inches (69 cm)
- Height: 42 inches (110 cm)
- Dedicated date: November 30, 2018
- Website: atlas.thc.state.tx.us/Details/5507018324

== Legacy and historical marker ==
Descendants of the victims of the massacre set up an organization. In 2018, they gathered for ceremonies in San Antonio and Austin to commemorate the 100th anniversary of the massacre. There was widespread media coverage marking the anniversary.

On November 30, 2018, the state placed an historical highway marker 27 miles west of Marfa on Highway 90 to commemorate the Porvenir Massacre. It was installed under the Texas Historical Commission's Undertold Stories Marker Program.

== See also ==
- Anti-Mexican sentiment
- Lynching of people of Mexican descent
