= Cult of Glory =

2020 nonfiction book by Doug J. Swanson

- First edition
- Author: Doug J. Swanson
- Subject: Texas Rangers
- Genre: Non-fiction
- Publisher: Viking Press
- Publication date: 2020

Cult of Glory: The Bold and Brutal History of the Texas Rangers is a 2020 nonfiction book by Doug J. Swanson. It describes the history of the Texas Rangers.

== Reception ==
Reviews of the books were mixed, with journalists and Texas historians unable to find consensus on the book's merits. Author and political historian, Douglas Brinkley, in a New York Times book review called the book "revisionist" as it shows incidents of violence not previously covered in histories of the Texas Rangers. Brinkley wrote that the author "portrays the 19th-century Rangers as a paramilitary squad, proudly waving the banner of white supremacy." Swanson claimed that he did not set out to challenge the previous historiography of the Texas Rangers but that this became apparent to him as he did more research. Of the impressions he took away from his research, Swanson said that the positive image of the Texas Rangers "has been crafted and many times is a fraud".

Cult of Glory was reviewed favorably in the Houston Chronicle, San Antonio Express-News, Dallas Morning News, Texas Monthly, the New York Times, and others. Texas Ranger scholars and historians, however, disagreed with the reviews of journalists. Texas historian and professor, Richard McCaslin, opined in The Journal of the Texas Supreme Court Historical Society, that "readers seeking an objective, well researched, or even reasonably accurate history of the Rangers will not find it here. In response to author Swanson's claims about the crafting of the positive Ranger image, McCaslin wrote "In fact, it is this work at falls within the category of modern mythmaking, as the author abandons objectivity and presents carefully selected episodes in Texas history, many of which do not directly involve the Rangers, to present a poorly researched and inaccurate condemnation." Ranger scholar and author, Darren L. Ivey described the book as "an example of advocacy journalism rather than historical analysis," taking issue with Swanson's research and source selection in the Wild West History Association Journal. "Swanson's book selectively disregards works that would have added crucial context and perspective," writes Ivey.

== Contents ==
The book is a 480-page chronological illustrated history of the Texas Rangers, examining each of the epochs of the force, 1821 to the modern Texas Rangers. Swanson's thesis is that the Texas Rangers "were the violent instruments of repression" of a white ruling class who preyed on Texans of color throughout their history.

== Aftermath ==
Joe Holley of the Houston Chronicle wrote that "apparently because of Swanson’s book" Dallas Love Field removed a statue of a Texas Ranger.

== The author ==
Douglas Jules Swanson, a native of Florida, was born in 1953. He graduated from University of Texas in 1977 and spent a year as the John S. Knight Journalism Fellow at Stanford University. He worked as a journalist for 35 years at the Dallas Times Herald and Dallas Morning News. Until Cult of Glory, he was best known for his 1990s mystery series about private investigator Jake Flippo. He was a finalist for the Pulitzer Prize in 1981. He has taught journalism and writing at Southern Methodist University, the University of North Texas, and the University of Texas at Austin. As of 2021, Swanson is a Research Associate Professor in the English Department at the University of Pittsburgh.

== Bibliography ==
=== References ===
- Brinkley, Douglas (June 9, 2020). "The True Story of the Texas Rangers". The New York Times (book review). ProQuest 2410638726 (U.S. Newsstream database).
  - Print version of article: "Ranger Danger". New York Times Book Review: 13. June 14, 2020. ProQuest 2412496184 (U.S. Newsstream database).
- "Doug Swanson" (bio). University of Pittsburgh, Department of English. n.d.
- Holley, Joe (August 10, 2020). "Swanson's Cult of Glory Paints a Complex Picture of the Storied Texas Rangers". Houston Chronicle (book review).
- MacCormack, John (June 27, 2020). "Review: New Book Reveals the Rest of the Texas Rangers' History". San Antonio Express-News (book review).

=== Primary references ===
- Swanson, Douglas Jules (June 2020). "The Horrible Truth of Love Field's Texas Ranger Statue". D Magazine (book review). (includes an excerpt from the 2020 book, Cult of Glory)
- Swanson, Douglas Jules (2020). Cult of Glory: The Bold and Brutal History of the Texas Rangers. Viking Press – via Google Books. LCCN 2019-49804 (e-book), LCCN 2019-49805 (print); ISBN 978-1-1019-7988-4 (e-book); OCLC 1235946866 (all editions).
