= Porvenir, Texas =

- Ghost town
- Location within Texas Location within the United States
- Coordinates: 30°25′07″N 104°50′40″W
- Country: United States
- State: Texas
- County: Presidio
- Elevation: 3,019 ft (920 m)
- Time zone: UTC-6 (Central (CST))
  - Summer (DST): UTC-5 (CDT)
- Area code: 432
- GNIS feature ID: 2033953

Porvenir (also Daniel and Polaris) is a ghost town in Presidio County, Texas, United States.

== History ==
After Texas Rangers murdered 15 Mexican-American residents on January 28, 1918, in the Porvenir massacre, Porvenir was abandoned.
