= Texas Ranger Division =

Texas law enforcement agency

- Patch

- Logo

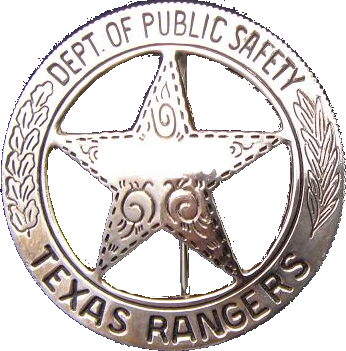
- Badge
- Common name: Texas Rangers

Agency overview
- Formed: October 17, 1835; 191 years ago (modeled after Stephen F. Austin's 1823 ranger companies)
- Preceding agency: Texas State Police

Jurisdictional structure
- Operations jurisdiction: Texas, U.S.
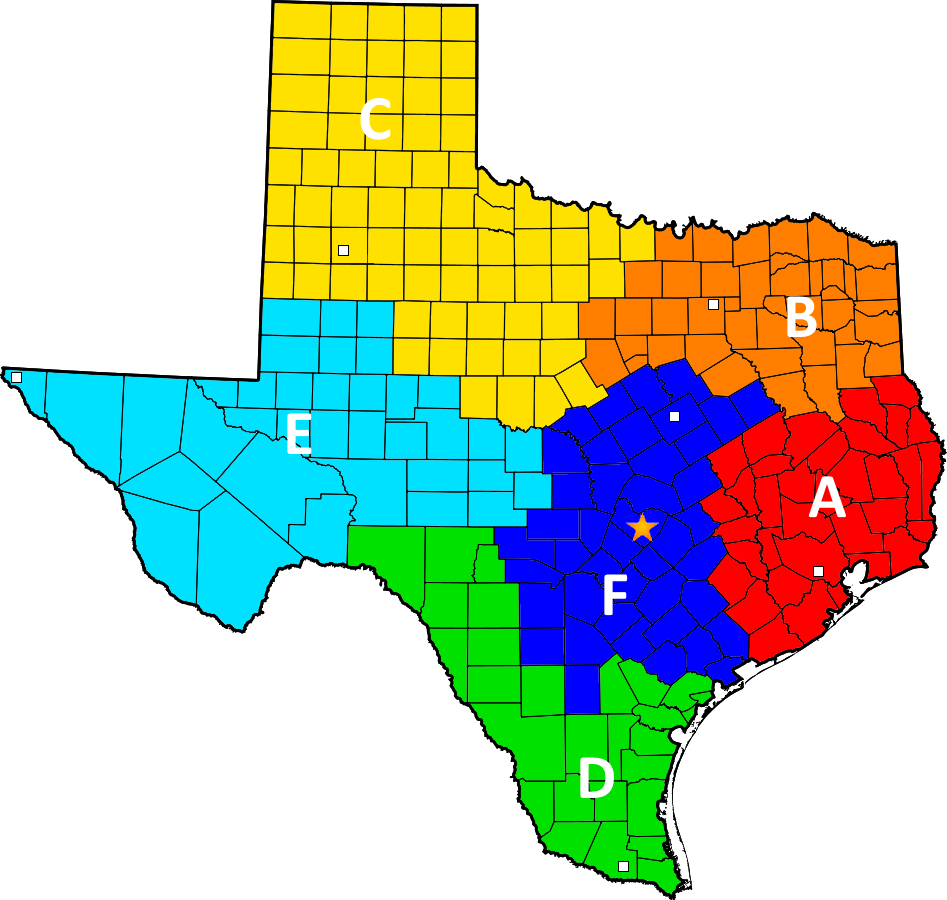
- Map of Texas Ranger Division's jurisdiction
- Area: 268,820 square miles (696,240 km^{2})
- Population: 31,290,831 (2024 est.)
- General nature: Civilian police

Operational structure
- Headquarters: Austin, Texas, U.S.
- Texas Rangers: 234
- Support employees: 68
- Agency executive: Scotty Shiver, Chief
- Parent agency: Texas Department of Public Safety
- Companies: 6

Website
- dps.texas.gov/texas-rangers

The Texas Ranger Division, also known as the Texas Rangers and nicknamed the Diablos Tejanos (Spanish for 'Texan Devils'), is an investigative law enforcement agency with statewide jurisdiction in the U.S. state of Texas, based in the capital city Austin. The Texas Rangers have investigated crimes ranging from murder to political corruption, acted in riot control and as detectives, protected the governor of Texas, tracked down fugitives, served as a security force at important state locations, including the Alamo, and functioned as a paramilitary force at the service of both the Republic (1836–1846) and the State of Texas. Today they also conduct cybercrime investigations, cold case reviews, public corruption probes, and provide tactical support in major emergencies.

The Texas Rangers were unofficially created by Stephen F. Austin in a call-to-arms written in 1823. After a decade, on August 10, 1835, Daniel Parker introduced a resolution to the Permanent Council creating a body of rangers to protect the Mexican border. The unit was dissolved by the federal authorities after the Civil War during the Reconstruction Era but was quickly reformed upon the reinstitution of home government. Since 1935, the organization has been a division of the Texas Department of Public Safety (TxDPS); it fulfills the role of Texas' state bureau of investigation. As of 2019, there are 166 commissioned members of the Ranger force.

The Rangers have taken part in many of the most important events of Texas history, such as stopping the assassination of presidents William Howard Taft and Porfirio Díaz in El Paso, and in some of the best-known criminal cases in the history of the Old West, such as those of gunfighter John Wesley Hardin, bank robber Sam Bass, and outlaws Bonnie and Clyde.

Scores of books have been written about the Rangers, from well-researched works of nonfiction to pulp novels and other such fiction, making the Rangers significant participants in the mythology of the Wild West and modern culture. The Lone Ranger, perhaps the best-known example of a fictional character derived from the Texas Rangers, draws his alias from having once been a Texas Ranger. Following close after, a classic titled Lone Star Justice by Robert Utley explains the life of Texas Rangers from the very beginning, showcasing the development of the now structured law force. More well-known examples include the radio and television series Tales of the Texas Rangers, Augustus McCrae and Woodrow Call from the Larry McMurtry novel series Lonesome Dove, and Chuck Norris portraying Cordell Walker in Walker, Texas Ranger. The Major League Baseball (MLB) team Texas Rangers is named after the division.

The Rangers are legally protected against disbandment. There is a museum dedicated to the Texas Rangers known as the Texas Ranger Hall of Fame and Museum in Waco, Texas, which celebrates the cultural significance of the Rangers.

== History ==
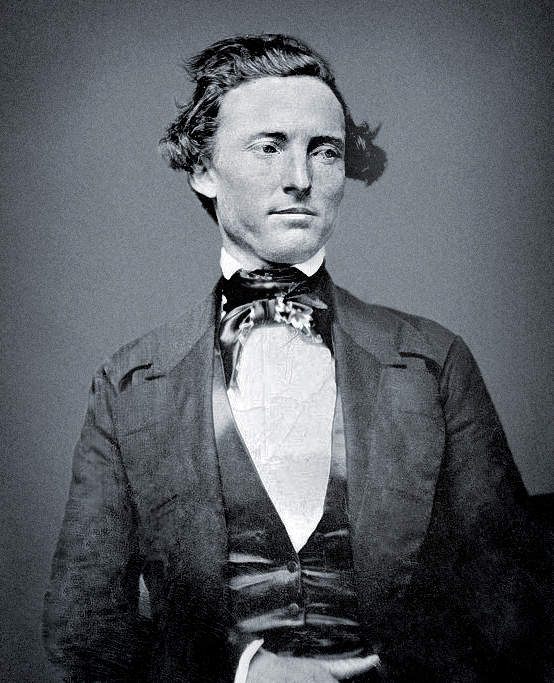
Samuel Hamilton Walker (1817–1847)

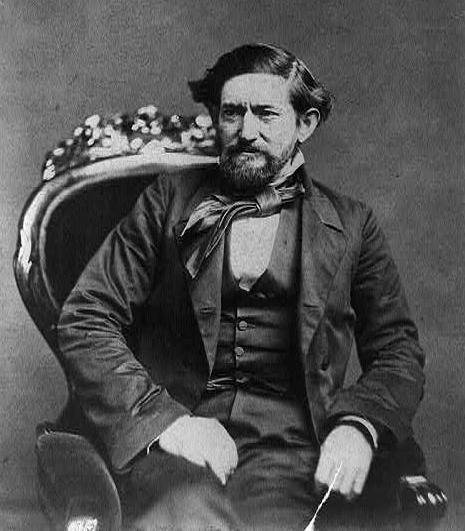
John Coffee Hays

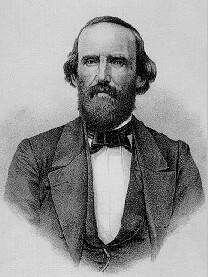
Benjamin McCulloch

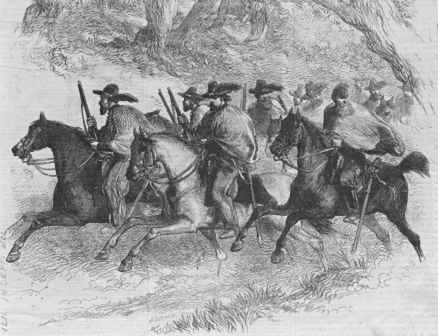
An early depiction of a group of Texas Rangers, c. 1845

The rangers were founded in 1823 when Stephen F. Austin, known as the Father of Texas, employed ten men to act as rangers to protect 600 to 700 newly settled families who arrived in Mexican Texas following the Mexican War of Independence. While there is some discussion as to when Austin actually employed men as "rangers", Texas Ranger lore dates the year of their organization to this event. The Texas Rangers were formally constituted in 1835, and in November, Robert McAlpin Williamson was chosen to be the first Major of the Texas Rangers. Within two years the Rangers comprised more than 300 men.

Following the Texas Revolution and the creation of the Republic of Texas, newly elected president Mirabeau B. Lamar (the second elected president of the Republic) raised a force of 56 Rangers to fight the Cherokee and the Comanche, partly in retaliation for the support they had given the Mexicans at the Cordova Rebellion against the Republic. Ten Rangers were killed in the Battle of Stone Houses in 1837. The size of the Ranger force was increased from 56 to 150 men by Sam Houston, as President of the Republic, in 1841 (the second time he was elected president of the Republic).

The Rangers continued to participate in skirmishes with Native Americans through 1846, when the annexation of Texas to the United States and the Mexican–American War saw several companies of Rangers mustered into federal service. They played important roles at various battles, acting as guides and participating in counter-guerrilla warfare, soon establishing a fearsome reputation among both Mexicans and Americans. At the Battle of Monterrey in September 1846, famous Texas Rangers such as John Coffee "Jack" Hays, Ben McCulloch, Bigfoot Wallace and Samuel Hamilton Walker played important roles in the battle, including advising General William Jenkins Worth on the tactics required to fight inside a Mexican city. Richard Addison Gillespie, a famed Texas Ranger, died at Monterrey, and General Worth renamed a hill "Mount Gillespie" after him. The First Regiment of Texas Mounted Rifle Volunteers was also known as "Hays' Texas Rangers". Colonel Hays organized a second regiment of Texas Rangers, including Rip Ford, who fought with General Winfield Scott in his Mexico City Campaign and the Anti-guerrilla campaign along his line of communications to Vera Cruz.

Throughout the 19th century the Texas Rangers relied heavily on multi-generation families raised on the frontier who were able to help during many conflicts. The Highsmith family displays this well as several members served in the Rangers during the Republic of Texas, the Mexican-American War, and even the Reconstruction time period. They were able to demonstrate how beneficial well experienced families could impact the progression of the force.

John Jackson Tumlinson Sr., the first alcalde of the Colorado district, is considered by many Texas Ranger historians to be the first Texas Ranger killed in the line of duty. One of his most urgent issues was protection of settlers from theft and murder by marauders. On his way to San Antonio in 1823 to discuss the issue with the governor, Tumlinson was killed by Native Americans. His traveling companion, a Mr. Newman, escaped. Tumlinson's body was never found.

Following the end of the war in 1848, the Rangers were largely disbanded, but the election of Hardin Richard Runnels as governor in 1857 meant US$70,000 (equivalent to $2,418,750 in 2025) was allocated to fund the Rangers under John Salmon "Rip" Ford, a veteran of the Mexican war. The now 100-strong Rangers participated in campaigns against the Comanche and other tribes, whose raids against the settlers and their properties had become common. Fighting alongside the Texas Rangers were the Tonkawa's, a rival tribe of the Comanche's. Ford and his Rangers fought the Comanche in the Battle of Little Robe Creek in 1858 and then Juan Cortina in the Battle of Rio Grande City the following year with Capt. Peter Tumlinson.

The success of a series of campaigns in the 1860s marked a turning point in Rangers' history. The U.S. Army could provide only limited and thinly-stretched protection in the enormous territory of Texas. By contrast, the Rangers' effectiveness when dealing with these threats convinced both the people of the state and the political leaders that a well-funded and organized state Ranger force was essential. Such a force could use the deep familiarity with the territory and the proximity with the theater of operations as major advantages in its favor. This option was not pursued, in view of the emerging national political problems (prelude to the American Civil War), and the Rangers were again dissolved.

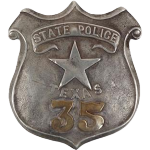
Badge of a Texas State policeman

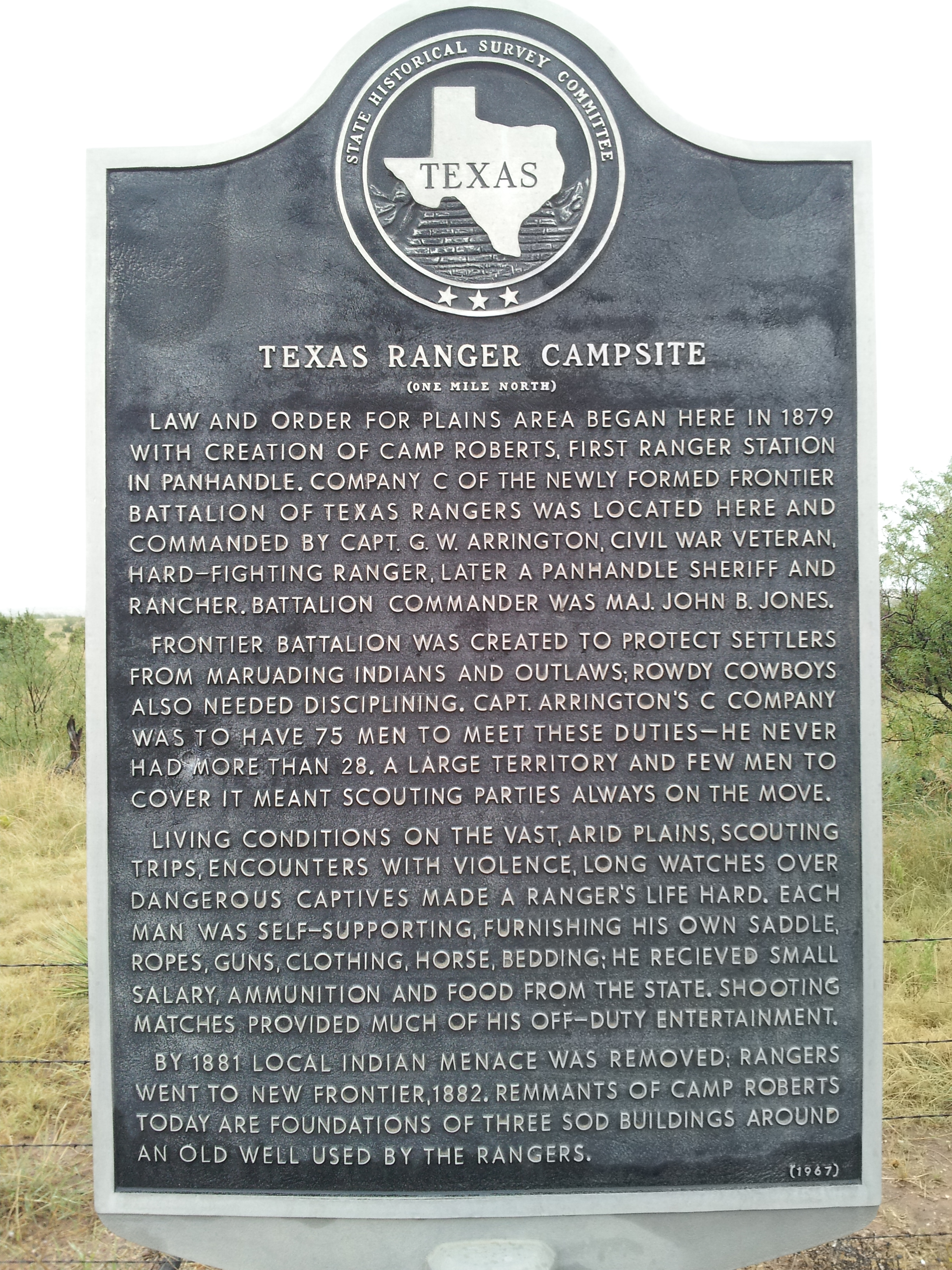
Texas Historical Marker for Texas Ranger Camp Roberts in Blanco Canyon

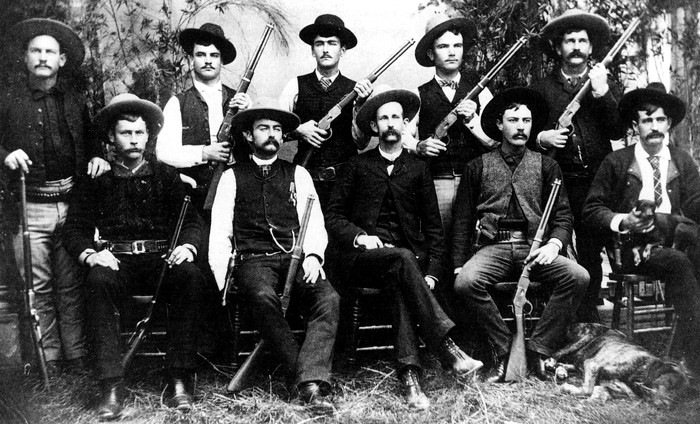
Members of the Frontier Battalion, a company of Texas Rangers, c. 1885

Many Rangers enlisted to fight for the Confederacy following the secession of Texas from the United States in 1861 during the Civil War. The 8th Texas Cavalry Regiment was also known as Terry's Texas Rangers. In 1870, during Reconstruction, the Rangers were briefly replaced by a Union-controlled version called the Texas State Police; supplemented by the 30 man Texas Special Police. Both organizations were disbanded only three years later. The state election of 1873 saw newly elected Governor Richard Coke and the state legislature recommission the Rangers. During these times, many of the Rangers' myths were born, such as their success in capturing or killing notorious criminals and desperados (including bank robber Sam Bass and gunfighter John Wesley Hardin), their involvement in the Mason County War, the Horrell-Higgins Feud, and their decisive role in the defeat of the Comanche, Kiowa and Apache peoples. The Apache "dreaded the Texas Rangers...whose guns were always loaded and whose aim was unerring; they slept in the saddle and ate while they rode, or done without...when they took up our trail they followed it determinedly and doggedly day and night." Also during these years, the Rangers suffered the only defeat in their history when they surrendered at the Salinero Revolt in 1877. After the Reconstruction ended, the original Texas Rangers were reestablished in 1874 under the leadership of Captain Leander H. McNelly, signaling a return to local control.

Despite the fame of their deeds, the conduct of the Rangers during this period was illegally excessive. In particular, Leander McNelly and his men used ruthless methods that often rivaled the brutality of their opponents, such as taking part in summary executions and confessions induced by torture and intimidation.

Capt. Monroe Fox and two other Rangers on horseback with their lariats around the bodies of dead Mexicans, after the Norias Ranch Raid August 8, 1915

The Rangers next saw serious action at the summit of William Howard Taft and President Porfirio Díaz in 1909, preventing an assassination of both presidents, and during the subsequent Mexican Revolution. The breakdown of law and order on the Mexican side of the border, coupled with the lack of federal military forces, meant the Rangers were once again called upon to restore and maintain law and order, by any necessary means, which again led to excesses. However, the situation necessitated the appointment of hundreds of new special Rangers by the state, which neglected to carefully screen aspiring members. The Rangers were responsible for several incidents, ending in the January 28, 1918 massacre of the male population (15 Mexican men and boys ranging in age from 16 to 72 years) of the tiny community of Porvenir, Texas, on the Mexican border in western Presidio County. Before the decade was over, thousands of people died, Texans and Mexicans alike. In January 1919, an investigation launched by Texas lawmaker José Tomás Canales found that from 300 to 5,000 people, mostly of Hispanic descent, had been killed by Rangers from 1910 to 1919, and that members of the Rangers had been involved in many acts of brutality and injustice. The Rangers were reformed by a resolution of the Legislature in 1919, which saw the special Ranger groups disbanded and a complaints system instituted.

The Great Depression forced both the federal and state governments to cut down on personnel and funding of their organizations, and the number of commissioned officers was reduced to 45, with the only means of transportation afforded to Rangers being free railroad passes or using their personal horses. The agency was again damaged after supporting Governor Ross Sterling in his re-election campaign—after his opponent Miriam Amanda "Ma" Ferguson won, she proceeded to discharge all serving Rangers in 1933. After Miriam Amanda "Ma" Ferguson fired all the Rangers they had to rebuild to force, which did not come without major issues. The new Rangers were not ready for the job, and this time period was filled with lawlessness and chaos.

The ensuing disorganization of law enforcement in the state caused the Legislature to engage a firm of consultants to reorganize the state security agencies. The consultants recommended merging the Rangers with the Texas Highway Patrol under a new agency called the Texas Department of Public Safety (DPS). This change took place in 1935, with an initial budget of US$450,000 (equivalent to $10,567,354 in 2025). With minor rearrangements over the years, the 1935 reforms have ruled the Texas Rangers' organization until present day. Hiring new members, which had been largely a political decision, was achieved through a series of examinations and merit evaluations. Promotion relied on seniority and performance in the line of duty. Today, the historical importance and symbolism of the Texas Rangers is such that they are protected by statute from being disbanded.

Since the Rangers merged with the Texas Department of Public Safety (DPS), they slowly became less of the "frontier lawmen" they were before. Hollywood however, popularized the 'wild west' image with shows such as "The Lone Ranger," which drastically raised the Rangers popularity with the public. The focus was shifted away from the mistakes of the past and restored the image of the Rangers being noble public servants and romanticized the lifestyle. The television show, "The Lone Ranger" and later films demonstrated an appreciation for the purpose of having the Rangers and what the Rangers intend to fight for, protecting and serving the public.

== 1919 Canales investigation ==
On January 31, 1919, the Joint Committee of the Senate and the House convened at the state capitol in Austin, Texas, to begin an investigation of the Texas Rangers. The investigation was prompted by José Tomás Canales, a state representative from Brownsville, Texas. Canales filed 19 charges against the Texas Rangers and declared a state of emergency as a result of the violent policing practices that he alleged were routinely used by the state force against Mexican Americans and Mexican nationals living along the US-Mexico border. The final report acknowledged that there had been misconduct, recommended the force be reconstructed and reduced in size, and that certain policies be enacted to govern Ranger activity. Canales felt that while the outcome was not ideal, the effort was a success, because the public was now aware of the Rangers activities. Canales also introduced a piece of legislation, House Bill 5, which proposed reorganizing the Texas Rangers and increasing the minimum qualifications and pay.

From January 31 to February 13, 1919, the committee heard testimony from people across the state, including victims of state violence, witnesses or surviving relatives, and members of the Texas Rangers. The Texas State Library and Archives Commission has preserved the full transcript of the investigation, which consists of over 1600 pages of testimony and evidence.

The testimony revealed many issues within the Texas Rangers and highlighted several high-profile cases of abuse. For example, in January 1918, a group consisting of Texas Rangers belonging to Company B and four local ranchers executed 15 innocent Mexican men and boys in Porvenir, a small community in West Texas. In the aftermath, Texas Ranger Captain James Monroe Fox falsified official reports to Adjutant General James Harley to claim that the Porvenir residents had fired on the group of Rangers. Fox would later amend his statements and ultimately resigned under pressure in 1918. However, other Texas Rangers involved in the massacre remained on the force.

Another incident that came to light during the 1919 Investigation was the murder of Toribio Rodriguez, a Brownsville police officer, in December 1912. Rodriguez encountered a group of Texas Rangers and county law enforcement traveling in a hack with no lights. After Rodriguez asked the men to light the lamps on the hack, they began shooting at him. He returned home with a minor wound. However, the group of men went to Rodriguez's house, shot him in the back, and took him to the jail. Rodriguez died a few days later on November 14, 1912. At the time of the investigation, at least one of the Rangers involved, Captain John J. Sanders, was still active on the force.

Both particularly egregious cases offered a small sample of the many accounts of abuse that appear throughout the transcript. Witnesses also testified that violence by Texas Rangers extended beyond the US-Mexico border region and that other racial groups, and particularly African Americans, were subject to harassment and violence from the state agents.

On February 19, 1919, the committee presented its findings to the Texas House of Representatives. However, despite the revelations, the 1919 investigation did not produce the sweeping changes in the organization's culture that policymakers like Canales had wanted. Ultimately, no Texas Rangers were prosecuted for their involvement in acts of violence like the Porvenir Massacre or the murder of Toribio Rodriguez. While the committee acknowledged that "the conduct of certain members of the ranger force... is most reprehensible," they justified the Rangers’ continuing presence along the border and praised the majority of the state agents for their "great service... in the protection of property."

However, there were a few notable changes. The state legislators decided to reduce the force from well over 1,000 men to just 68 Rangers. The majority of the reduction came from eliminating the "Loyalty Rangers," a group of unpaid volunteer Rangers that was established during World War I to monitor acts of "disloyalty" in their communities. At the time of the investigation, there were approximately 800 Loyalty Rangers still in service. Many of the men who were dismissed moved into careers in local law enforcement or later in the US Border Patrol, which was established in 1924.

== Old West image ==
From its earliest days, the Rangers were surrounded with the mystique of the Old West. Although popular culture's image of the Rangers is typically one of rough living, tough talk and a quick draw, Ranger Captain John "Rip" Ford described the men who served him as this:

A large proportion ... were unmarried. A few of them drank intoxicating liquors. Still, it was a company of sober and brave men. They knew their duty and they did it. While in a town they made no braggadocio demonstration. They did not gallop through the streets, shoot, and yell. They had a specie of moral discipline which developed moral courage. They did right because it was right.

Despite the age of the agency, and the many contributions they have made to law enforcement over their entire history, Texas Rangers developed most of their reputation during the days of the Old West. Of the 79 Rangers killed in the line of duty, 30 were killed during the Old West period of 1858 through 1901. Also during this period, two of their three most high-profile captures or killings took place, the capture of John Wesley Hardin and the killing of Sam Bass, in addition to the capture of Texas gunman Billy Thompson and others. However, modern historians point out that this image was often constructed by sympathetic Anglo writers, minimizing the Rangers' controversial role in racial violence and political repression.

American historian Andrew Graybill has argued that the Texas Rangers resemble the Royal Canadian Mounted Police in many ways. He argues that each organization protected the established order by confining and removing Native Americans, by tightly controlling the mixed blood peoples (the African Americans in Texas, and the Métis in Canada), assisted the large-scale ranchers against the small-scale ranchers and farmers who fenced the land, and broke the power of labor unions that tried to organize the workers of industrial corporations.

=== "One Riot, One Ranger" ===
Texas Rangers gathered at El Paso to stop the illegal Maher–Fitzsimmons fight, 1896. At the front row from the left are Adj. General W Mabry, and Capts. J Hughes, J Brooks, Bill McDonald (coiner of the phrase) and J Rogers.

A famous phrase associated with the Rangers is One Riot, One Ranger. It is a sensationalized apocrypha in that there was never actually a riot; rather, the phrase was coined by Ranger Captain William "Bill" McDonald, who was sent to Dallas in 1896 to prevent the illegal heavyweight prize fight between Pete Maher and Bob Fitzsimmons that had been organized by Dan Stuart and patronized by the eccentric "Hanging Judge" Roy Bean of Langtry, Texas. According to the story, McDonald's train was met by the mayor, who asked the single Ranger where the other lawmen were. McDonald is said to have replied: "Hell! Ain't I enough? There's only one prize-fight!"

Although some measure of truth lies within the tale, it is largely an idealized account written by author Bigelow Paine and loosely based on McDonald's statements, published in Paine's 1909 book Captain Bill McDonald: Texas Ranger. In truth, the fight had been so heavily publicized that nearly every Ranger was on hand, including all captains and their superior, Adjutant General Woodford H. Mabry. Many of them were undecided on stopping the fight or attending it; and other famous lawmen, such as Bat Masterson, were also present. The orders of the governor were clear, however, and the bout was stopped. Stuart then tried to reorganize it in El Paso and later in Langtry, but the Rangers thwarted his attempts. Finally, the fight took place on the Mexican side of the Rio Grande near Langtry.

The motto appears on the pedestal of a bronze Texas Ranger statue that was at Dallas Love Field airport also titled One Riot, One Ranger. The statue was contributed in 1961 by Earle Wyatt and his wife. The Texas Ranger statue was removed from the airport and put in storage in 2020 after publication of the book Cult of Glory, which details a number of unsavory incidents involving the Rangers. According to Cult of Glory, the statue was modeled after Jay Banks, a pro-segregation Ranger of the era. Banks was on good terms with White Citizens' Councils and was involved in resistance to school integration after Brown v. Board of Education. The statue has since been reinstalled in Globe Life Field.

== High-profile cases ==
The Texas Rangers have assisted in many high-profile cases throughout the years. Some cases are deeply entrenched in the Rangers' lore, such as those of outlaw John Wesley Hardin, bank robber Sam Bass, and Bonnie and Clyde.

=== Sam Bass ===
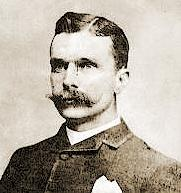
Bank robber Sam Bass

In the summer of 1878, Sam Bass, who had been in Texas since 1870, got confronted by Four Rangers in Round Rock when there was a shoot-out that followed where one of Bass' gang was killed outright. He was badly wounded but managed to escape. Sam Bass and his gang, who had perpetrated a series of bank and stagecoach robberies beginning in 1877, held up two stagecoaches and four trains within 25 miles (40 km) of Dallas. The gang quickly found themselves the object of pursuit across North Texas by a special company of Texas Rangers headed by Captain Junius "June" Peak. Bass was able to elude the Rangers until a member of his party, Jim Murphy, turned informer, cut a deal to save himself, and led the law to the gang. As Bass's band rode south, Murphy wrote to Major John B. Jones, commander of the Frontier Battalion of Texas Rangers.

Jones set up an ambush at Round Rock, where the Bass gang had planned to rob the Williamson County Bank. On July 19, 1878, Bass and his gang scouted the area before the actual robbery. They bought some tobacco at a store, and were noticed by Williamson County Sheriff Ahijah W. "Caige" Grimes, who approached the group and was shot and killed. A heavy gunfight ensued between the outlaws and the Rangers and local lawmen. A deputy named Moore was mortally wounded, as was Bass. The gang quickly mounted their horses and tried to escape while continuing to fire, and as they galloped away, Bass was shot again in the back by Ranger George Herold. Bass was later found lying helpless in a pasture north of town by the authorities. They took him into custody; he died from his wounds the next day.

=== John Wesley Hardin ===
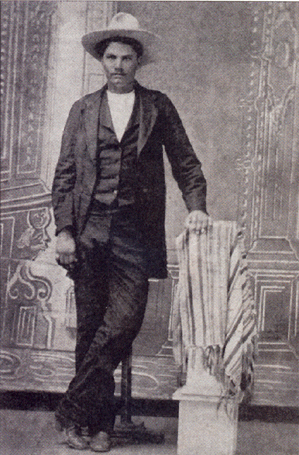
John Wesley Hardin

One of Texas's deadliest outlaws, John Wesley Hardin, was reputed to be the meanest man alive, an accolade he supposedly earned by killing a man for snoring. He committed his first murder at age 15, and admitted to killing more than 40 men over 27 years. In May 1874, Hardin killed Charles Webb, the deputy sheriff of Brown County and a former Texas Ranger. John Barclay Armstrong, a Texas Ranger known as "McNelly's Bulldog" since he served with the Special Force as a sergeant and Captain Leander McNelly's right hand, received permission to arrest the outlaw. He pursued Hardin across Alabama and into Florida, and caught up with him in Pensacola.

After Armstrong, Colt pistol in hand, boarded a train that Hardin and four companions were on, the outlaw shouted, "Texas, by God!" and drew his own pistol. When it was over, one of his gang members was killed, and his three surviving friends were staring at Armstrong's pistol. Hardin had been knocked unconscious. Armstrong's hat had been pierced by a bullet, but he was uninjured. Armstrong took Hardin back to Texas to face trial, where he was charged for murder, convicted, and sentenced to 25 years in prison. Seventeen years later, Hardin was pardoned by Governor Jim Hogg and released from prison on March 16, 1894. He moved to El Paso, where he began practicing law. On August 19, 1895, he was murdered during a poker game at the Acme Saloon over a personal disagreement.

=== Taft-Díaz assassination attempt ===
In 1909, Private C.R. Moore of Company A, "performed one of the most important feats in the history of the Texas Rangers". William Howard Taft and Porfirio Díaz planned a summit in El Paso, Texas and Ciudad Juárez, Mexico, a historic first meeting between a U.S. president and a Mexican president and the first time an American president would cross the border into Mexico. But tensions rose on both sides of the border, including threats of assassination, so the Texas Rangers, 4,000 U.S. and Mexican troops, United States Secret Service agents and United States Marshals were all called in to provide security. Frederick Russell Burnham, the celebrated scout, was put in charge of a 250-person private security detail hired by John Hays Hammond, a nephew of Texas Ranger John Coffee Hays, who in addition to owning large investments in Mexico was a close friend of Taft from Yale University and a U.S. vice-presidential candidate in 1908. On October 16, the day of the summit, Burnham and Private C.R. Moore discovered a man holding a concealed palm pistol standing at the El Paso Chamber of Commerce building along the procession route. Burnham and Moore captured, disarmed, and arrested the would-be assassin within only a few feet of Taft and Díaz.

=== Bandit War ===
The Bandit War, a small but major campaign during the Border War, was fought in 1910–1915 in Texas. The conflict was a series of violent raids conducted by Mexican revolutionaries in the American settlements of Tamaulipas, Coahuila and Chihuahua. The Texas Rangers became the primary fighting force and protection of the Texans during the operations against the rebels. The Mexican faction's incursion in the territory was carried out by the Seditionistas and Carrancistas, and led by major political leaders such as Basilio Ramos and Luis de la Rosca; however, the Seditionistas were never able to launch a full-scale invasion of the United States so they resorted to conducting small raids into Texas. Much of the fighting involved the Texas Ranger Division though the United States Army also engaged in operations against the rebels. The Texas Rangers were led by Captain Harry Ransom on the orders of the Governor of Texas, James E. Ferguson.

=== Bonnie and Clyde ===
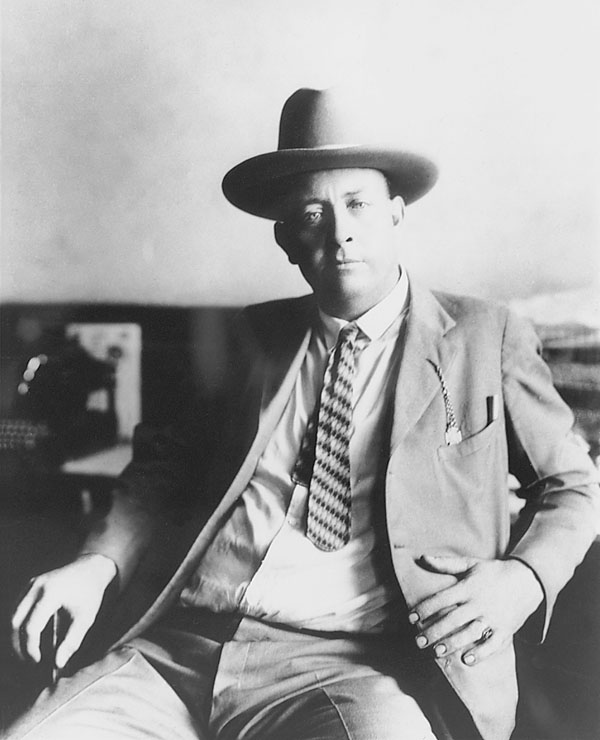
Frank Hamer, known in popular culture for tracking down and killing Bonnie and Clyde

Frank Hamer, the longtime Ranger Sergeant, left the Rangers in 1932. In 1934, at the request of Col. Lee Simmons, head of the Texas prison system, Hamer was asked to use his skills to track down Bonnie Parker and Clyde Barrow, whose Barrow gang had engineered a successful breakout of associates imprisoned at the Eastham Prison Farm in Houston County. Prisoner and Barrow friend Joe Palmer had killed a guard while escaping, and the Barrow gang was responsible for many murders, robberies, and car thefts in Texas alone. Nine law enforcement officers had already died in confrontations with the gang. Clyde Barrow and Bonnie Parker were incredibly difficult to track down by law enforcement officers because the Barrow gang was always moving, making it hard to pin them down in any one place. Another factor that made Clyde Barrow so hard to catch was that Clyde always had extreme firepower on him as the Barrow gang stole weapons from the United States National Guard's armory in 1934.

After tracking the Barrow gang across nine states, Hamer, in conjunction with officials in Louisiana, learned Bonnie and Clyde had visited a home in Bienville Parish on May 21, 1934, and that Clyde had designated a rendezvous point in the vicinity with gang member Henry Methvin, in case they were later separated. Methvin, allegedly cooperating with law enforcement, made sure he was separated from them that evening in Shreveport, and the posse set up an ambush along the route to the rendezvous at Highway 154, between Gibsland and Sailes. Led by former Rangers Hamer and B. M. "Manny" Gault, the posse included Sheriff Henderson Jordan and Deputy Prentiss Oakley of Bienville Parish, Louisiana, and Dallas County Deputies Bob Alcorn and Ted Hinton. They were in place by 9:00 that night, waiting all through the next day, but with no sign of Bonnie and Clyde.

Around 9:00 a.m. on May 23, the posse, concealed in the bushes and almost ready to concede defeat, heard Clyde's stolen Ford V-8 approaching. When he stopped to speak with Henry Methvin's father (planted there with his truck that morning to distract Clyde and force him into the lane closest to the posse), the lawmen opened fire, killing Bonnie and Clyde while shooting a combined total of approximately 130 rounds.

=== Irene Garza murder ===
The Texas Rangers have received widespread coverage for their role in the investigation of the death of Irene Garza, a Texas beauty queen. In 1960, Garza was last seen going to Sacred Heart Catholic Church in McAllen where Father John Feit heard her confession. Her body was found five days later in a canal. Autopsy results showed she had been raped while unconscious and died of asphyxiation, likely from suffocation. Feit was the primary suspect, but the case stalled for many years as the Hidalgo County district attorney did not feel that the evidence was sufficient to secure a conviction. Texas Ranger Rudy Jaramillo started working on the case in 2002. In 2015, under a new district attorney, Feit was indicted for murder. In December 2017, Feit was found guilty of murder with malice aforethought. Feit, aged 85, was sentenced to life imprisonment, bringing to close the longest unsolved criminal case in Hidalgo County.

=== Santa Claus Bank Robbery ===
In Cisco Texas, 1927 there was a robbery known as the “Santa Claus Bank Robbery” which involved four armed men, one disguised as Santa Claus, who stole thousands in cash and over $150,000 in bonds. A violent shootout followed, resulting in the death of Cisco Police Chief G.E. Bedford and a deputy. Despite those deaths the gang had to abandon their loot while running away. Captain Tom Hickman and Sergeant Manuel Gonzaullas of the Texas Rangers led one of the largest manhunts in state history using bloodhounds and even a biplane, the Rangers’ first use of aircraft in a search. The disguised robber was captured on December 27, and the remaining fugitives were arrested three days later near Graham.

== Duties ==
The duties of the Texas Ranger Division consist of conducting criminal and special investigations; apprehending wanted felons; suppressing major disturbances; the protection of life and property; and rendering assistance to local law enforcement in suppressing crime and violence. The Texas Ranger Division is also responsible for the gathering and dissemination of criminal intelligence pertaining to all facets of organized crime. They also maintain cold case investigation teams, cybercrime units, and public corruption task forces addressing modern threats. The Texas Ranger Division joins with all other enforcement agencies in the suppression of the same; under orders of the Director, suppress all criminal activity in any given area, when it is apparent that the local officials are unwilling or unable to maintain law and order; also upon the request or order of a judge of a court of record, Texas Rangers may serve as officers of the court and assist in the maintenance of decorum, the protection of life, and the preservation of property during any judicial proceeding; and provide protection for elected officials at public functions and at any other time or place when directed. In addition to these duties, the Rangers now lead efforts in investigating cybercrime, human trafficking, border-related violence, and public corruption. Specialized task forces focus on cold case homicides, organized crime, and digital evidence recovery. The Texas Rangers, with the approval of the Director, may conduct investigations of any alleged misconduct on the part of other Department of Public Safety personnel.

== Organization ==
The Texas Rangers' internal organization maintains the basic outlines that were set in 1935. The agency is divided into seven companies: six District Companies lettered from "A" to "F", and Headquarters Company "H". The number of personnel is set by the Texas Legislature; as of 2014, the Texas Rangers number 150 commissioned officers, one forensic artist, one fiscal analyst and 24 civilian support personnel. The Legislature has also made a provision for the temporary commissioned appointment of up to 300 Special Rangers for use in investigative or emergency situations. The statewide headquarters of the Texas Rangers is located in Austin at the Texas DPS headquarters. As of February of 2024, the Chief of the Texas Rangers Division is Chief Scotty Shiver.

The District Companies' headquarters are distributed in six geographical locations:

- Houston is the headquarters for Company A
- Garland is the headquarters for Company B
- Lubbock is the headquarters for Company C
- Weslaco is the headquarters for Company D
- El Paso is the headquarters for Company E
- Waco is the headquarters for Company F

Each company is commanded by a captain and is subdivided into squads led by lieutenants. Rangers operate with a high level of independence, often assigned to wide multi-county areas, and collaborate with local, state, and federal law enforcement agencies."Field Rangers" are supervised by a Senior Captain (Chief), Headquarters Captain (Assistant Chief), company majors and lieutenants. Sergeants and agents are also part of the rank structure of the Rangers.

Division Headquarters:

- Austin is the home of Division Headquarters, commanded by Chief Randall Prince. The Special Operations Group includes Special Weapons and Tactics Team (SWAT), Bomb Squad, Ranger Reconnaissance Team, Special Response Teams (SRT), Crisis Negotiation Teams (CNT), and Border Security Operations Center (BSOC) – Joint Operations and Intelligence Centers (JOIC). Specialized programs include the Unsolved Crimes and Public Corruption/Public Integrity investigations.

=== Texas Rangers rank structure ===
- Sergeant
- Lieutenant
- Captain
- Major
- Assistant Chief
- Chief

The selection process for becoming a Texas Ranger is highly competitive. Applicants must currently work with the Texas Department of Public Safety and have extensive prior law enforcement experience, typically eight years or more, and demonstrate exceptional investigative, interviewing, and case management skills. Applicants will take an entrance exam, with the highest scores moving onto an oral interview. Only a small number are selected each cycle. The average Ranger was 44 years old in 2020.

== Uniforms ==
Modern-day Rangers (as well as their predecessors) do not have a prescribed uniform per se, although the State of Texas does provide guidelines as to appropriate Ranger attire, including a requirement that Rangers wear clothing that is western in nature. Currently, the favored attire includes white shirt and tie, khaki/tan or gray trousers, light-colored western hat, "ranger" belt, and cowboy boots. Historically, according to pictorial evidence, Rangers wore whatever clothes they could afford or muster, which were usually worn out from heavy use. While Rangers still pay for their clothing today, they receive an initial stipend to offset some of the costs of boots, gunbelts and hats.

To carry out their horseback missions, Rangers adapted tack and personal gear to fit their needs. Until the beginning of the 20th century, the greatest influence was from the vaqueros (Mexican cowboys). Saddles, spurs, ropes and vests used by the Rangers were all fashioned after those of the vaqueros. Most Rangers also preferred to wear broader-brimmed sombreros as opposed to cowboy hats, and they favored square-cut, knee-high boots with a high heel and pointed toes, in a more Spanish style. Both groups carried their guns the same way, with the holsters positioned high around their hips instead of low on the thigh. This placement made it easier to draw while riding a horse.

== Badges ==
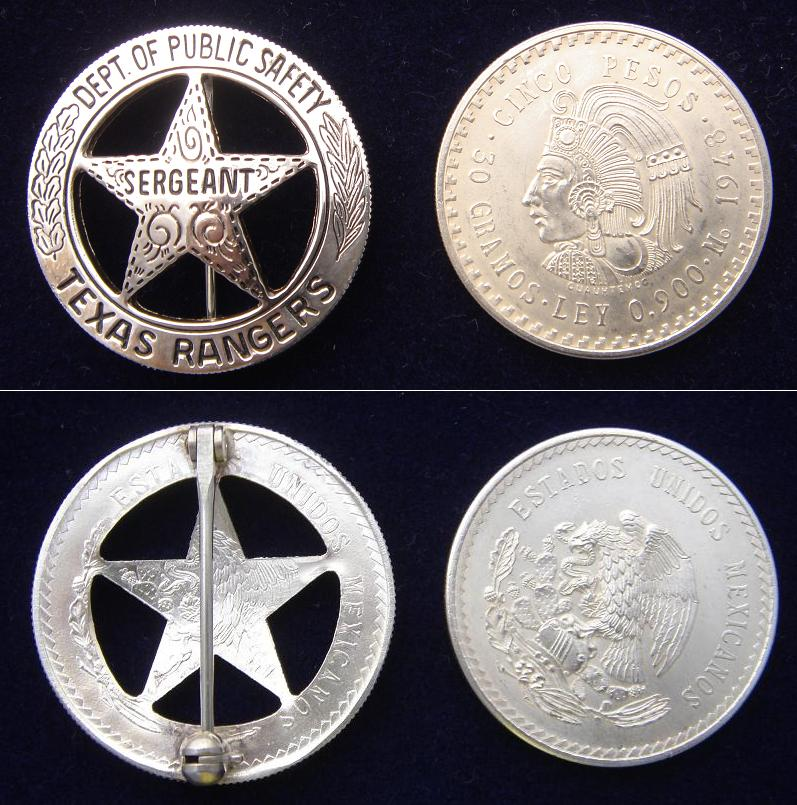
The modern-day badge of a Texas Ranger is shown beside the obverse and reverse of a 1948 Mexican cinco pesos coin from which it is made.

The wearing of badges became more common in the late 1800s. Historians have suggested several reasons for the lack of the regular use of a badge; among them, some Rangers felt a shiny badge was a tempting target. Other historians have speculated there was no real need to show a badge to a hostile Native American or outlaw. Additionally, from a historical viewpoint, a Ranger's pay was so scanty that the money required for such fancy accoutrements was rarely available. Nevertheless, some Rangers did wear badges, and the first of these appeared around 1875. It has been noted by the DPS that Rangers from earlier times designed their own badges. They were locally made and varied considerably from one to another, but they invariably consisted of a star cut from a Mexican silver coin (usually a five-peso coin). The star-in-a-wheel design represents both independence and unity, hallmarks of Texas's frontier history and the mission of the Rangers. The design is reminiscent of Texas's Lone Star flag.

Although present-day Rangers wear the familiar "star in a wheel" badge, it was adopted officially only recently. The current design of the Rangers' badge was approved in 1962, when Ranger Hardy L. Purvis and his mother donated enough Mexican five-peso coins to the DPS to provide badges for all 62 Rangers who were working at that time as commissioned officers.

== Awards ==
On rare occasions, a Texas Department of Public Safety Commissioner's Medal of Valor has been issued. According to the Texas Ranger Hall of Fame and Museum, the "Medal of Valor has been awarded to four Texas Rangers - Sgt. William R. Gerth, Sgt. Stanley Keith Guffey, Sgt. John Aycock, Sgt. Danny V. Rhea." Aycock was awarded the Medal of Valor twice, in 1987 and 1995.

== Rangers killed ==
Since the establishment of the Texas Department of Public Safety Texas Rangers Division, 124 Rangers have been killed in the line of duty. The following list also contains officers from the Texas Rangers, which was merged into the Texas Department of Public Safety.

The causes of death are as follows:

| Causes of death | Number of deaths |
|---|---|
| Assault | 26 |
| Automobile accident | 2 |
| Duty related illness | 7 |
| Drowned | 3 |
| Gunfire | 76 |
| Gunfire (accidental) | 5 |
| Stabbed | 2 |
| Struck by train | 2 |
| Struck by vehicle | 1 |
| Total | 124 |

== Hall of Fame and Museum ==
The Texas Ranger Hall of Fame and Museum opened in Waco in 1968. Authorized by the Texas Department of Public Safety and the Texas Legislature, it preserves and presents the history and heritage of the Texas Rangers. The museum houses more than 14,000 artifacts, including weapons, badges, uniforms, personal gear, and artworks related to the Rangers.

The Hall of Fame honors Rangers who have made significant contributions to the division and to Texas history. Inductees are selected by a board of historical advisors and serve as representatives of the Rangers' service, bravery, and legacy. The museum also features a research center dedicated to the scholarly study of Ranger history, making it an important resource for historians and the public alike.

== See also ==
- Arizona Rangers
- Colorado Rangers
- La Matanza (1910–1920)
- List of law enforcement agencies in Texas
- New Mexico Mounted Patrol

== General references ==
- Barrow, Blanche Caldwell & John Neal Phillips (ed.). My Life with Bonnie & Clyde, University of Oklahoma Press (2004). ISBN 0-8061-3625-1.
- Barton, Henry W. (1960). "The United States Cavalry and the Texas Rangers". The Southwestern Historical Quarterly. 63 (4): 495–510. JSTOR 30236145.
- Boessenecker, John. Texas Ranger: The Epic Life of Frank Hamer, the Man Who Killed Bonnie and Clyde, St. Martin's Press (2016) ISBN 978-1250131591.
- Caballero, Raymond (2015). Lynching Pascual Orozco, Mexican Revolutionary Hero and Paradox. Create Space. ISBN 978-1514382509.
- Cox, Mike. Texas Ranger Tales: Stories That Need Telling, Republic of Texas, (1998). ISBN 1-55622-537-7
- Cox, Mike. The Texas Rangers: Wearing the Cinco Peso, 1821–1900 (vol. 1, 2009)
- Cox, Mike. Time of the Rangers: Texas Rangers: From 1900 to the Present (2010)
- Cantrell, Gregg (1999). Stephen F. Austin: Empresario of Texas. New Haven and London: Yale University Press. ISBN 978-0-300-09093-2.
- [Daily Mail] (October 16, 1909). "Mr. Taft's Peril; Reported Plot to Kill Two Presidents". Daily Mail. London. ISSN 0307-7578.
- Dishman, Christopher. A Perfect Gibraltar: The Battle for Monterrey, Mexico. University of Oklahoma Press (2010). ISBN 978-0806141404
- Doyle, Brett. Laird Transactions, Texas Lodge of Research, Captain Peter F. Tumlinson: Texian Ranger and Mason. Doyle, Brett Laird XXXIX (2004–2005) 113–24 Published by the Texas Lodge of Research A. F. & A. M. 2006.
- Ford, John Salmon. Rip Ford's Texas, University of Texas Press (1987). ISBN 0-292-77034-0.
- Graybill, Andrew (2004). "Texas Rangers, Canadian Mounties, and the Policing of the Transnational Industrial Frontier, 1885–1910". Western Historical Quarterly. 35 (2): 167–191. doi:10.2307/25442969. JSTOR 25442969.
- Hammond, John Hays (1935). The Autobiography of John Hays Hammond. New York: Farrar & Rinehart. OCLC 1147755388. Reprint: ISBN 978-0-405-05913-1.
- Hampton, Benjamin B (April 1, 1910). "The Vast Riches of Alaska". Hampton's Magazine. 24 (1).
- Harris, Charles H. III; Sadler, Louis R. (2004). The Texas Rangers and the Mexican Revolution: The Bloodiest Decade, 1910–1920. Albuquerque, New Mexico: University of New Mexico Press. ISBN 0-8263-3483-0.
- Harris, Charles H. III; Sadler, Louis R. (2009). The Secret War in El Paso: Mexican Revolutionary Intrigue, 1906–1920. Albuquerque, New Mexico: University of New Mexico Press. ISBN 978-0-8263-4652-0.
- Johnson, Benmamin Herber. Revolution in Texas: How a Forgotten Rebellion and Its Bloody Suppression Turned Mexicans into Americans, Yale University Press (2003). ISBN 0-300-09425-6
- Keil, Robert (2002). Bosque Bonito: Violent Times Along the Borderland During the Mexican Revolution. Alpine, TX: Center for Big Bend Studies, Sul Ross State University. ISBN 978-0970770905
- Knight, James R. & Davis, Jonathan. Bonnie and Clyde: A Twenty-First-Century Update, Eakin Press (2003). ISBN 1-57168-794-7
- Levario, Miguel (2012). Militarizing the Border: When Mexicans Became the Enemy. College Station, TX: Texas A & M University Press. ISBN 978-1603447584
- Martinez, Monica Muñoz. The Injustice Never Leaves You: Anti-Mexican Violence in Texas. Harvard University Press (2018). ISBN 978-0674976436
- Miller, Rick. Texas Ranger John B. Jones and the Frontier Battalion, 1874–1881 (University of North Texas Press; 2012) 401 pages; a history of the battalion that focuses on Jones
- Moore, Stephen L. Texas Rising: The Epic True Story of the Lone Star Republic and the Rise of the Texas Rangers, 1836–1846. William Morrow, (2015). ISBN 978-0062394309
- Parsons, Chuck & Marianne E. Hall Little. Captain L. H. McNelly, Texas Ranger: The Life and Times of a Fighting Man, State House Press (2000). ISBN 1-880510-73-1.
- Robinson, Charles. The Men Who Wear the Star: The Story of the Texas Rangers, Modern Library, (2001). ISBN 0-375-75748-1
- Swanson, Doug, J. Cult of Glory: The Bold and Brutal History of the Texas Rangers. Viking Press, (2020). ISBN 978-1101979860
- Utley, Robert M. Lone Star Lawmen: The Second Century of the Texas Rangers. Oxford University Press (2007). ISBN 978-0195154443
- Villanueva, Nicholas (2017). The Lynching of Mexicans in the Texas Borderlands. Albuquerque, NM: University of New Mexico Press. ISBN 978-0826358387
- Webb, Walter Prescott. The Texas Rangers: A Century of Frontier Defense, University of Texas Press (1989). ISBN 0-292-78110-5
- Weiss, Harold J. (1994). "The Texas Rangers Revisited: Old Themes and New Viewpoints". The Southwestern Historical Quarterly. 97 (4): 620–640. JSTOR 30242465.
- Wilkins, Frederick (2001). Defending the Borders: The Texas Rangers, 1848–1861, State House Press. ISBN 1-880510-41-3.
- Wilkins, Frederick (1999). The Law Comes to Texas: The Texas Rangers 1870–1901, State House Press. ISBN 1-880510-61-8.
- Wilkins, Frederick (1996). The Legend Begins: The Texas Rangers, 1823–1845, State House Press. ISBN 1-880510-41-3.
