= Plan of San Diego =

1915 planned uprising in the United States

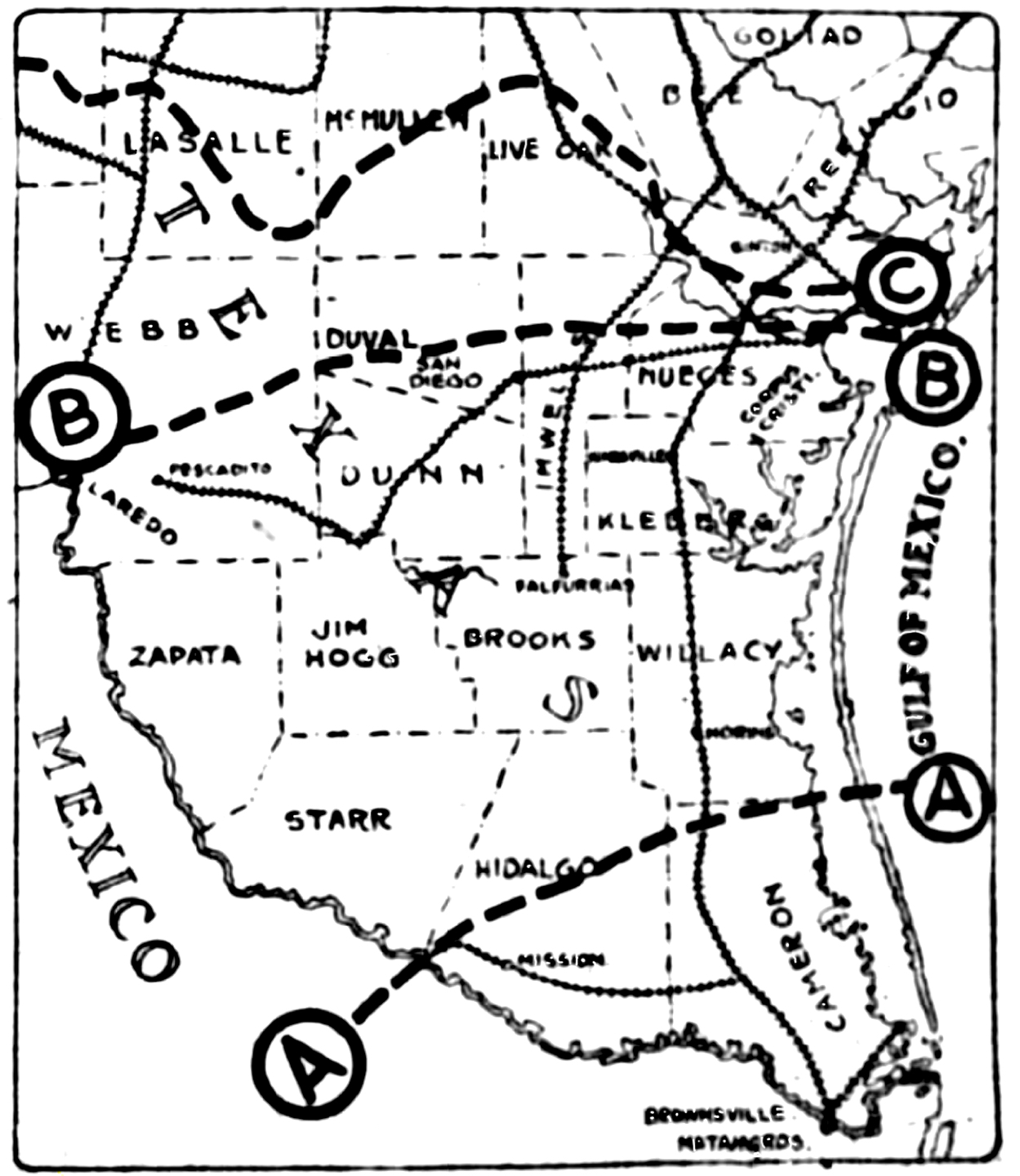
- "South of A is the district most wrought-up at this time (November 1915). South of B is the scene of the de la Rosa and Pizaña operations. South of C is what is included in the Plan of San Diego." (St. Louis Post-Dispatch, November 7, 1915)
- Date: January 6, 1915
- Location: San Diego, Texas
- Participants: Mexicans – Huertistas, Carrancistas, Floresmagonistas

The Plan of San Diego (Spanish: Plan de San Diego) was a plan drafted in San Diego, Texas, in January 1915, by a friend of Basilio Ramos Jr., Augustin S. Garza, and A. A. Saenz, along with six unidentified Huertistas, who would end up signing the document. The group of Mexican and Tejano rebels hoped to seize Arizona, New Mexico, California, Colorado, and most importantly Texas, in order to create an independent libertarian republic for Mexicans and Tejanos, from the United States. The plan also called for neighboring states of those aforementioned to be seized by those of African and Japanese descent in order to create republics in the same organizational structure of the Hispanic state envisioned by the plan. The plan also included promises to the Indigenous people who resided in these lands to have their land returned to them, regardless of their participation in the plan, or lack thereof.

It called for a general uprising in February, 1915, with the mass killings of every non-Hispanic Caucasian male over 16 years of age. The area for revolt included all of South Texas. German Americans were excluded from the killings, suspected to be because of Imperial German involvement in the uprising. Some theories also state that the true goal of the plan was to create the conditions to force the US to support one of the factions of the Mexican Revolution, namely the Carrancistas, which eventually occurred.

Although there was no large-scale uprising, due in fact to prominent proponents being imprisoned or killed, supporters of the plan initiated the Bandit War, launching raids into Texas from Mexico and from inside Texas itself, that began in July 1915. The raids were countered by the US Army, local self-defense groups, and the Texas Rangers, whose escapades in the region during this time were met with intense criticism due to indiscriminate killing of Mexicans. In total, 30 raids into Texas destroyed large amounts of property and killed 21 Americans. A train robbery at Tandy's Station also occurred, resulting in the deaths of 5 people and the wounding of 6 others. It is not known who drafted the Plan of San Diego, but some speculate that Mexican revolutionary leaders helped to sponsor it.

== Background ==
During the Mexican Revolution, the Porfirio Díaz government fought with rebellious factions from 1910 onward, causing some rebels and refugees to flee from the Díaz government to the United States, especially to Texas. These fleeing Mexicans, as well as descendants of former Mexican nationals residing in Texas due to territorial changes of the Mexican–American War, known as Tejanos, would take up jobs and government positions, and buy and found ranches in the region. The Plan of San Diego grew out of racial strife between White landowners and Mexican workers.

Aniceto Pizaña, an associate of Ricardo Flores Magón, founded a PLM foco in the area, and would use his political knowledge of anarchist communism and socialist theory in order to educate Mexican and Tejano laborers and farm workers of the injustices they faced. Mexicans and Tejanos would receive less pay than White workers for doing the same job, with pay differences becoming as drastic as 78% less for Hispanics than Whites at times. Luis de la Rosa, another follower of Magón, would also become instrumental in organizing Hispanic laborers and farm workers. Due to ethnic tensions between Mexicans and Tejanos with Whites, as well as rampant discrimination of the former by the latter, coinciding with a mass influx of Mexicans over the border seeking refuge from the Mexican Revolution, it became a perfect storm for Magonistas to recruit and spread their ideology. These two men would end up joining the Plan of San Diego after Texas Rangers accused them both of hiding guerillas on their lands, resulting in their persecution and attempted murder by the Rangers without evidence, further radicalizing them.

== Content ==
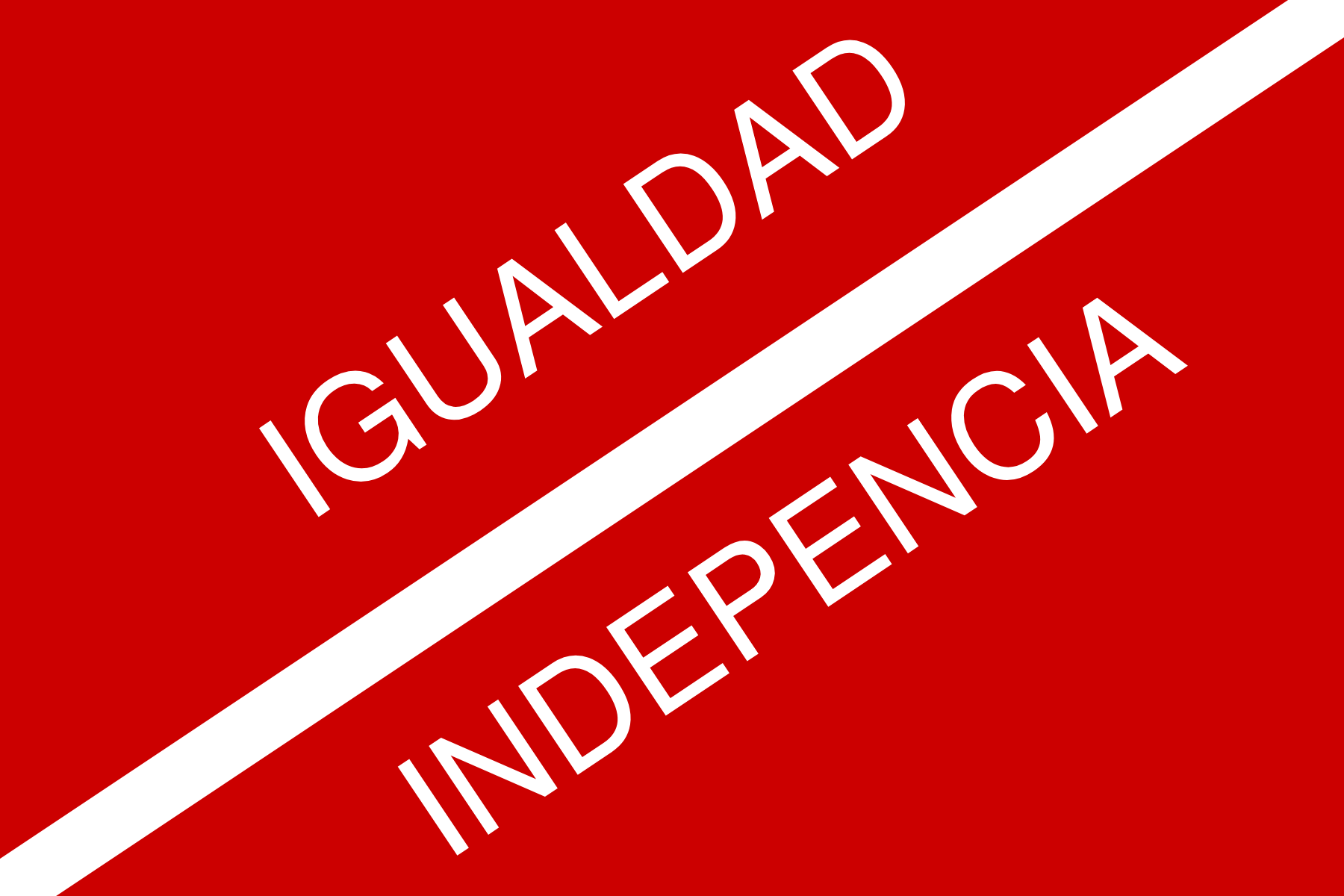
The flag of the Plan of San Diego as outlined in the Plan itself.

Declaring the creation of a Liberating Army of Races and Peoples, the Plan of San Diego called for the recruitment of Mexican Americans, African Americans, Native Americans, and Japanese Americans to rebel against the United States. The central goal of the plan was to free Texas, New Mexico, Arizona, California, and Colorado from US control (see Reconquista). These states would become an independent republic that in the future could be reunited with Mexico. To the north, neighboring states of those aforementioned would be seized by those of African and Japanese descent in order to create republics in the same organizational structure of the Hispanic state envisioned by the plan, as well as to become a buffer zone between the United States and the new Mexican and Tejano republic, which was never named.

On February 20, 1915, the plan called for starting the execution of "North American" (most likely to be interpreted as White) men over the age of 16; only the elderly, women, and children were to be spared. A notable provision of the plan was the protection of Native Americans, with their land being returned to them, regardless of participation in the war.

The plan was penned in San Diego, Texas, but it was actually signed by rebels inside a jail cell in Monterrey, Mexico.

On February 20, when the plan was supposed to be enacted, rebel leaders instead revised the plan to focus solely on the liberation of Texas, which would become a base from which to advance the revolution throughout the Southwestern United States.

== Theories ==
=== Huertistas ===
One theory is that Victoriano Huerta, a leader of a Mexican faction vying for governmental control in the Mexican Revolution, was the mastermind behind the plan. The theory rests on the capture of Huertista Basilio Ramos in Brownsville, Texas, in January 1915. In his possession was a copy of the Plan of San Diego. Under interrogation in jail in Monterrey, he admitted to signing the plan, along with eight Huertista cellmates. A jailer had supposedly smuggled in a copy of the plan to give to the inmates. Ramos credited the creation of the plan to another unnamed Huertista, who hoped to reconquer the Southwestern United States to gain domestic support in Mexico for Huerta.

=== Carrancistas ===
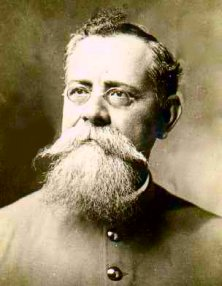
Venustiano Carranza

Another theory states that the Mexican government under Venustiano Carranza, who became president of Mexico in 1914, supported the drafting of the Plan of San Diego in order to exploit the tension between Tejanos and white Americans inside southern Texas. Although the plan explicitly stated that there would be no aid from the Mexican government, the Carranza government was actually crucial in keeping the plan in action. Some believe that Carranza wanted to exacerbate conflict between Americans and Mexicans in Texas to force the United States to recognize him as the true leader of Mexico, as ultimately happened.

== Raids ==
The first raids under the Plan of San Diego were conducted in July 1915, five months after the agreed start date of February 20. The first raids targeted Mexican Americans who were prominent in agriculture and local town politics in Texas. On July 11, at the Magnolia dance ground in Brownsville, raiders shot and killed Tejano deputy Pablo Falcon, the first victim of the Plan of San Diego. One of the raiders was Ignacio Cantu, a Mexican who had been arrested by Falcon a week earlier.

As raids grew in number, the "high tide" of the Plan of San Diego was August and September 1915. The raids during this period were led by cousins Aniceto Pizana and Luis de la Rosa, well-known residents of South Texas. The latter, according to Clair Kenamore of the St. Louis Post-Dispatch, was born in Brownsville and was a former deputy sheriff. The raids were conducted in the style of guerrilla warfare, with the overall purpose of razing US public and private property.

De la Rosa and Pizana created small bands, somewhat like military companies, constructed of 25 to 100 men. The Rio Grande Valley was the focus of the raids, where trains were fired upon and telegraph wires and poles were cut down. On August 8, nearly 60 raiders struck the Norias Ranch, leaving five men dead when chased by American forces. US authorities learned from this raid and from the wounded left behind that support from the Mexican Carranza government supplied the raiders, half of the men being Mexican citizens.

Mexican support was crucial in keeping the offensive alive when the plan was enacted. Mexico supplied half of the men on guerrilla missions and even used Mexican newspapers as propaganda in the border towns, where they exaggerated the success of Mexicans against white Americans and urged further participation.

== US reaction ==
The raids and the propaganda, as well as white Texans' general fear, prompted authorities to send federal troops and Texas Rangers, who struggled to counter the raids. Eventually, on October 19, 1915, President Woodrow Wilson, as urged to by his staff to appease Carranza, officially recognized Carranza as the legitimate leader of Mexico. Then, Carranza used his armies to assist the Americans in capturing and imprisoning raiders, which ended the high tide of the Plan of San Diego.

White Americans became increasingly hostile and suspicious of Mexican Americans both during and after the Plan of San Diego raids. Small personal conflicts between Mexican Americans and White Americans led to the lynching and the execution of Mexicans by Texas Rangers, local officers and law enforcement, and civilians. Local whites founded the vigilante Law and Order League in 1915, fueled by suspicions of Mexican and Tejano insurrection. Texas Governor James Ferguson contributed to lynchings and violence by promising pardons in advance to Rangers, asserting that "I have the pardoning power and we will stand by those men..." Ferguson threatened further escalation of such violence in a June 1916 proclamation, demanding that "If they [Tejanos] do not in some manner show their loyalty to this State and Nation they will bring trouble upon themselves and many crimes will be committed which cannot be prevented..." Federal officials estimated that from late 1915 to 1916, more than 300 Mexican Americans were slain in Texas. The 1919 Canales investigation into misconduct by the Texas Rangers estimated that from 1914 to 1919, between 300 and 5,000 ethnic Mexicans were killed by American law enforcement personnel engaged in suppressing the raids.

About 400 Anglo-Texans were killed in total during raids from Mexico along the border during the 1910s, and much property was destroyed.

The Americans thought that German agents may have been involved as well, but no evidence has been uncovered. Threats of Mexican reconquest, however, reminiscent of the Plan of San Diego, reappeared in Germany's Zimmermann telegram of 1917, which helped push the United States into war with Germany during World War I.

== Aftermath ==
In March 1916, Mexican revolutionary Pancho Villa raided Columbus, New Mexico. In response, the American government sent the Pancho Villa Expedition deep into Mexico to catch him. It failed to do so, but the Mexican government responded to US forces entering Mexico by resuming raids northward. The crisis escalated to the verge of formal war but was resolved by diplomacy. Carranza was the driving force behind the resurgence of raids.

== See also ==
- La Matanza (1910–1920)

== Primary sources ==
- Steven Mintz, ed. (2009). Mexican American Voices: A Documentary Reader. Wiley-Blackwell. pp. 122–4. ISBN 9781405182607.
