= José Tomás Canales =

American politician

Member of the Texas House of Representatives from the 95th district
- In office January 10, 1905 – January 10, 1911

Member of the Texas House of Representatives from the 77th district
- In office January 9, 1917 – January 11, 1921

Personal details
- Born: March 7, 1877 Nueces County, Texas, U.S.
- Died: March 30, 1976 (aged 99) Brownsville, Texas, U.S.
- Party: Democratic
- Education: Texas Business College University of Michigan Law School
- Occupation: Attorney

José Tomás Canales (March 7, 1877 – March 30, 1976) was an American businessman, lawyer, and politician based in Texas. He served five terms in the State House, where he was the only Mexican-American representative at the time. He is best known for his work on behalf of Mexican-Americans and Tejanos in Texas, defending the civil rights of Hispanic Americans.

As a state representative, in 1919 he led a state investigation into the Texas Rangers, who had been accused of crimes and abuses in the Rio Grande Valley, and along with the US 8th Cavalry, were involved in the Porvenir Massacre in deep west Texas on the west side of the Sierra Vieja, north of Candelaria and Ruidosa. The committee heard testimony from 83 witnesses, who revealed extensive abuses by the Rangers of minorities and other poor citizens. After his service in the State House, Canales continued his work as civil rights activist through several Hispanic and Latin American organizations.

== Early life ==
Canales was born in 1877 on his family ranch in Nueces County, Texas, the son of Andreas and Tomasa (Cavazos) Canales, a Tejano family who had deep roots in Texas that preceded the Anglo-Americans. He was a descendant of José Salvador de la Garza, who once held a Spanish land grant encompassing much of present-day Cameron County. Canales' family maintained significant ranch land in the area when he was born.

He went to the public schools in Nueces County and to the Texas Business College in Austin, Texas. Canales went North to study law, receiving his degree from University of Michigan Law School in 1899. After his return to Texas and passing the bar, he worked for a few years in Corpus Christi and Laredo.

He settled in Brownsville, Texas, where he set up a practice. He married Anna Anderson Wheeler. Their family included a daughter, Elizabeth McCaw Canales.

During his life, he acquired 30,000 acres, which he initially dedicated mostly to ranching. Later he had much of the land developed for cotton.

== Career ==
Canales became active in the Democratic Party and entered politics, running for the State House. He was elected and served for a total of five terms in the Texas House of Representatives, from 1905 to 1911 and from 1917 to 1921. He first represented the 95th District (Cameron, Hidalgo, Starr and Zapata counties). After redistricting, he was elected from the 77th district (Cameron and Willacy counties).

Between his periods of service as a representative, Canales served as superintendent of public schools for Cameron County from 1912 to 1914. He left to serve a term as county judge for Cameron County.

=== Political career ===
Canales was the sole Mexican-American representative in the state legislature during his years in the State House. He gained electoral support in his large district by his support of prohibition and women's suffrage.

In 1909 he broke over prohibition with Democratic supporter, Texas Governor James B. Wells Jr. Canales ran for county judge as an independent, but was unsuccessful. In 1910, he worked to organize Latin American scouts to gather intelligence about Mexican raids into Texas. Mexican social unrest was making the border more volatile. During the decade of the Mexican Revolution 1910-1920), revolutionary raids across the border damaged American ranches, irrigation systems, railroads and other infrastructure.

Canales served as superintendent of the Cameron County public school system. He worked to emphasize English-language education and rural education initiatives.

After being reelected to the House of Representatives in 1917 as a Democrat, Canales served as chair of the House Committee on Irrigation. In 1917 he helped gain passage of legislation preventing Mexican migrant workers from draft evasion in the United States, shortly before the US entered the Great War in Europe.

Canales was an outspoken critic of the Texas Rangers force, who retaliated against raiders and had sometimes acted as vigilantes along the border, especially against people of Mexican descent, citizen and migrant alike. In 1918 he brought 19 charges of misconduct against the Rangers for actions during the border wars.

=== Canales investigation ===
A joint committee of the state Senate and House was set up to investigate the actions of the Texas Rangers, with hearings to be held in early 1919. Before the hearings, in December 1918 Canales was directly threatened by Frank Hamer, a noted Ranger, and he reported this to Governor William P. Hobby. Hamer was never disciplined and stalked Canales at the capital. State representative Samuel Ealy Johnson Jr., father of future president Lyndon B. Johnson, was among legislators who escorted Canales to the hearings as protection.

The 1919 Canales investigation, as it became known, heard testimony from 83 witnesses over a period of two weeks, including Anglo, Hispanic, and African-American Texans, and Mexican migrants, who recounted abuses by Texas Rangers. Incidents included the Porvenir massacre in January 1918 of 15 unarmed ethnic Mexicans near the border, whom the Rangers rounded up from their settlement. The investigation estimated that the Rangers may have killed between 300 and 5,000 people, mostly of Mexican descent, between 1914 and 1919. This material added support for widespread reform within the Rangers.

Canales had supported a bill calling for professionalization of the force (which also provided for increased pay). Restrictions were added to reduce Texas Ranger vigilante actions against Mexicans and Tejanos in the Rio Grande Valley, and provide for citizen complaints. But the bill which Canales supported to regulate the force was so weakened in its final version that he voted against it.

As a result of the personal and political backlash against him for the hearings, Canales did not run for re-election in 1920. In later years Canales reflected that his family feared he would be assassinated and said that the investigation had "nearly cost my life".

=== Civil rights ===
After his 1920 retirement from politics, Canales became an advocate for Mexican-American civil rights, working with the Order of the Sons of America, one of the first civil rights organizations for Mexican-Americans in Texas. In 1927, he addressed the Harlingen Convention, organized to address statewide racial discrimination. After the conference, he became the first president of the Latin American Citizens League. Alongside Alonzo Perales in 1929, he wrote much of the League of United Latin American Citizens' constitution. Canales served as president of the organization for the term 1932-1933, and established its first scholarship fund.

=== Historian ===
Canales wrote books and articles about Texas history. Much of his work was self-published, covering topics such as law, religion, and Mexican-American history. His autobiography, Personal Recollections of J. T. Canales (1945), is his best-known work.

== Death ==
Canales died in Brownsville, Texas on March 30, 1976. His wife, Anne Anderson Wheeler Canales, had died before him.
