= List of factions in the Mexican Revolution =

This is a list of factions in the Mexican Revolution.

== Carrancistas ==
Revolutionary followers of Venustiano Carranza from 1913 to 1914, and thereafter the Government army from 1914 until his death in 1920. In 1915, an insurgent group known as the Sediciosos was formed and supported by the Carrancistas.

== Constitutionalistas (Constitutionalists) ==
Title first used for all anti-Huerta forces in the north before the 1914 breakaway of Pancho Villa following the defeat of Victoriano Huerta. Venustiano Carranza, the "First Chief" of the Revolution, attracted talented generals to his faction, most especially Álvaro Obregón. Obregón defeated Villa's División del Norte in the Battle of Celaya, ending Villa as a national force. The Constitutionalists were eventually the victorious faction of the Revolution, with Carranza becoming president of Mexico and the Mexican Constitution of 1917, drafted by this winning faction in a constitutional convention at Querétaro, was promulgated.

== Conventionists ==
Joint name for Villistas and Zapatistas as supporters of the Convention of Aguascalientes. Held in October–November 1914, the northern coalition that defeated Huerta in July 1914 attempted to settle the path forward following the victory. Pancho Villa dominated the convention, but Alvaro Obregón also played a role. Villa had split from Carranza following Huerta's defeat, while Obregón remained loyal to First Chief Venustiano Carranza. Those supporting Villa marginalized Carranza's role. Emiliano Zapata and Villa pledged support for each other's armies, but it was in principle only, not in practice. Eulalio Gutiérrez was elected president of Mexico by the convention. Carranza and Obregón retreated to Veracruz. The Conventionists briefly held practically all Mexican territory, but the central authority was weak and could not hold the advantage against the smaller Constitutionalist faction. Obregón decisively defeated Villa in a series of battles the summer of 1915, ending the Conventionists as a force.

== Federales ==
Term used for all Government troops from Mexican independence in 1821 to 1914, but usually associated particularly with Victoriano Huerta's Federal Army. (Huerta was president from February 1913 to July 1914). The Federal Army was disbanded in August 1914 following Huerta's resignation and exile.

See also Rurales for national mounted police force forming part of the Federal forces under Porfirio Díaz and Huerta.

== Felicistas ==
Adherents of Brig. General Félix Díaz, nephew of former president Porfirio Díaz, who opposed both the Madero and Carranza governments in rebellions between 1913 and 1920. He led the reactionary conservative National Reorganizer Army in ineffective revolts late in the Revolution.

== Huertistas ==
Supporters of Victoriano Huerta, dictator of Mexico from February 1913 to July 1914.

== Maderistas ==
Name given to various revolutionary armies fighting under the umbrella leadership of Francisco I. Madero in 1910–11, during the first part of the war. Maderistas in the postrevolutionary phase of Mexican history sought to keep alive the memory of Madero, who was martyred during the February 1913 Ten Tragic Days.

== Magonistas ==
The military wing of the Partido Liberal Mexicano (PLM) under the leadership of the Flores-Magon brothers, who organised abortive local uprisings against Díaz in 1906 and 1908, and fomented further revolts after 1911, particularly in Baja California. A force of Magonistas was led by the Welsh soldier of fortune General Caryl Ap Rhys Pryce, the "Gringo Revolutionary".

== Orozquistas (Colorados) ==
Followers of Pascual Orozco, also known as the Colorados ("Red Flaggers"). They fought first for Madero, 1910–11, and revolted against his government in 1912 under the Plan Orozquista, before joining the Huerta army in February 1913. Contemporary newspaper reports on the Mexican Revolution referred to Colorados as the "irregulars" of the Federal Army.

== Porfiristas ==
Supporters of long-time Mexican dictator Porfirio Díaz. The Porfiristas were generally conservative, experienced bureaucrats (popularly known as cientificos or scientists) and soldiers of the Díaz regime. After the fall of Díaz, many Porfiristas made intrigues with Reyistas, Huertistas, and Felicistas.

== Reyistas ==
Supporters of long time military man and politician General Bernardo Reyes. Reyes and Reyistas participated in the plotting of the coup to overthrow Madero in La decena trágica of February 1913, in which both Madero and Reyes were killed. The Reyistas had major support from America in the forms of arms and ammunition supplied by the El Paso Reyista Junta, headed by a Rafael Limón Molina.

== Villistas ==
Followers of Francisco "Pancho" Villa, mainly serving in the División del Norte (Northern Division). Formed part of the Maderista forces, and later fought in opposition to the Huerta and Carranza governments, the Villistas later formed a spatially isolated alliance with the Zapatistas, who remained in Morelos. Villa's men were mostly made up of vaquero and charro caudillos, rancheros, shopkeepers, miners, migrant farm workers, unemployed workers, railway workers, and Maderista bureaucrats, who seized haciendas and fought for an undefined socialism. Adolfo Gilly wrote that Villismo, though fighting for land redistribution and justice, did not challenge capitalist relations as previously set down during the Porfiriato, but was merely an outgrowth of the bourgeois state-oriented revolution of Madero.

== Zapatistas ==
Followers of Emiliano Zapata, based in Morelos state from 1911 until his death in 1919. They fought for Madero until Zapata became disillusioned with his policies, and thereafter in opposition to all Mexican governments until their leader's death in 1919. The Zapatistas fought for radical land redistribution and political autonomy, and rallied behind the anarchist demand, ¡Tierra y Libertad!.
