= Mexican Border War =

U.S. and Mexican fighting on the border during the Mexican Revolution

- Part of the U.S. intervention in the Mexican Revolution, Banana Wars, and World War I
- M. R. Pankratz of Company A, 22nd Infantry, and Mexican soldier Simón Montes at the Arizona–Sonora state line, 22 December 1915, weeks after the Second Battle of Agua Prieta.
Date	20 November 1910 – 16 June 1919 (8 years, 6 months, 3 weeks and 6 days)
Location	Mexico–United States border
Result	Status quo ante bellum: Seditionist insurgency suppressed; Permanent border fence established along the border of Ambos Nogales; American troops fail to capture Pancho Villa and withdraw from Chihuahua

Belligerents
Shifting factions Maderistas Magonistas Villistas Carrancistas	United States	Sediciosos (1915–1916)

Commanders and leaders
Francisco I. Madero Ricardo Flores Magón Pancho Villa Venustiano Carranza	Frederick Funston; John J. Pershing; George Bell Jr. James B. Erwin	Luis de la Rosa; Aniceto Pizaña

The cluster of armed incidents along the Mexico–United States border from about November 1910 to June 1919 is often called the Mexican Border War or Border Campaign in U.S. popular and unit history. Histories of the Mexican Revolution treat the same fighting as American involvement in a Mexican civil war, not as a declared interstate war.

United States troops, Texas Rangers, and Mexican revolutionary and federal forces fought along and across the boundary. Mexican factions fought one another more often than they fought the United States. Washington recognized, embargoed, and sometimes invaded according to which faction held Mexico City.

In 1915–16 the fighting on the river overlapped with a sedicioso insurgency in the Lower Rio Grande under the Plan of San Diego. Raiders struck ranches and rail lines; Texas Rangers, posses, and some U.S. troops answered with a campaign against ethnic Mexicans in South Texas. Anglo papers called the campaign the "Bandit War"; Tejano memory named it la matanza. Links between the raiders and Venustiano Carranza, the head of the Constitutionalist Army are disputed.

The largest crises were the occupation of Veracruz, Pancho Villa's raid on Columbus, New Mexico, John J. Pershing's subsequent Punitive Expedition, and the Battle of Ambos Nogales. Between those peaks there were documented fights across Sonora, Chihuahua, Coahuila, Tamaulipas, Arizona, New Mexico, Texas, and across the California-Baja California line.

== Background ==
The 1910–19 fighting is treated by some historians as part of a longer continuum of border conflict. Gastón García Cantú places the Veracruz occupation and Pershing’s expedition inside a record of U.S. armed entries, filibusters, naval seizures, and cattle crossings that reaches back into Mexico’s late colonial period.

On the Texas bank, a separate literature treats the river as a zone of Tejano resistance. Elliott Young frames Catarino Garza’s 1891–93 campaign within “a longer history of border rebellion,” bracketed by Juan Cortina’s wars and the 1915 insurngency. Benjamin Heber Johnson locates the Plan of San Diego in the post-1848 displacement of Tejano landholders rather than as an isolated event of the Mexican Revolution.

== 1910–1914 ==
=== Maderista Revolution ===
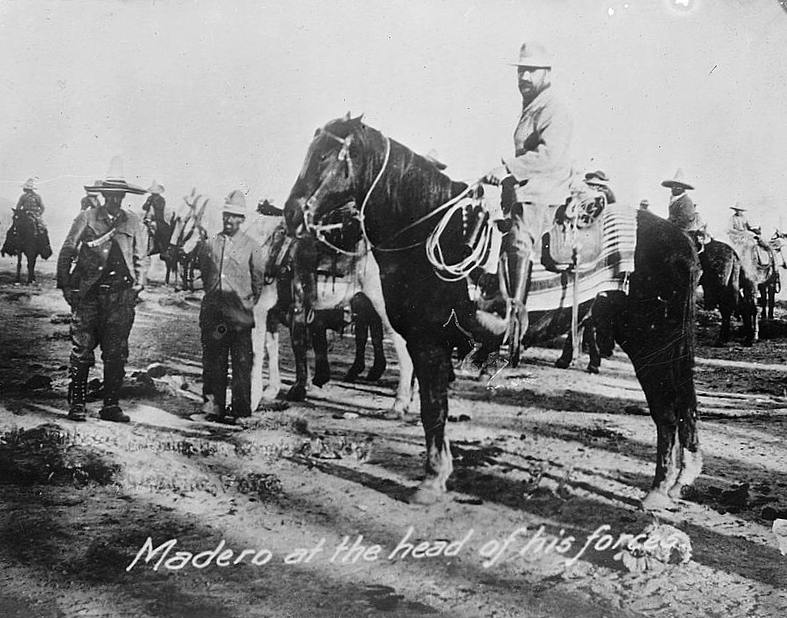
Mexican statesman, revolutionary and soon-to-be president Francisco Madero with his troops in 1910

Francisco I. Madero issued the Plan of San Luis Potosí on 5 October 1910. It nullified the recent presidential election of Porfirio Díaz and called for an uprising that became the Mexican Revolution. Madero crossed into Chihuahua and led the revolt.

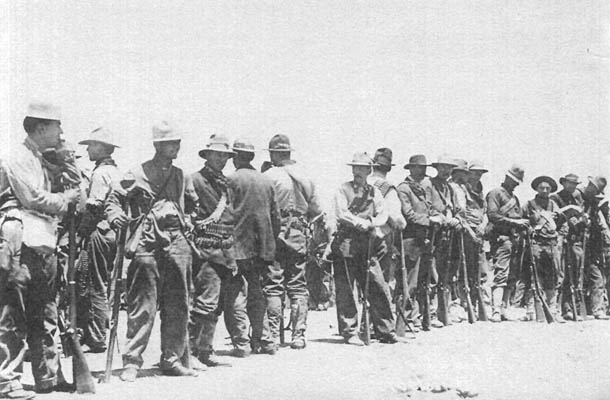
American Magonistas after the First Battle of Tijuana in 1911

During the First Battle of Ciudad Juárez, Maderistas under Pascual Orozco and Villa closed on the federal garrison while the U.S. post at El Paso exchanged stray fire with both sides. At Agua Prieta in April 1911 Mexican fire carried into Douglas, Arizona; American troops returned it and the rebels kept the town.

Independently of Madero, Ricardo Flores Magón’s Partido Liberal Mexicano, launched a more radical insurgency in Baja California. On 29 January 1911 a small PLM force crossed near Mexicali, seized an arms cache on the California side, and captured the town with little resistance. The force grew with American volunteers, including members of the Industrial Workers of the World, and took Tijuana on 8–9 May after a fight watched by civilians from the U.S. customs house. John Kenneth Turner and others purchased rifles in Los Angeles and shipped them through Holtville and Calexico. President William Taft ordered troops to the border; units from Fort Rosecrans patrolled the San Diego–Calexico line to interdict supplies. After federal forces under Colonel Celso Vega retook Tijuana in June, surviving Magonistas were interned on the American side. Ricardo and Enrique Flores Magón were later convicted in Los Angeles of neutrality violations.

U.S. neutrality statutes were enforced against Magón, against Orozco after he broke with Madero, and at times against Villa, and applied more loosely when the faction in Mexico City was the one Woodrow Wilson favored.

=== Anti-Huerta campaign ===
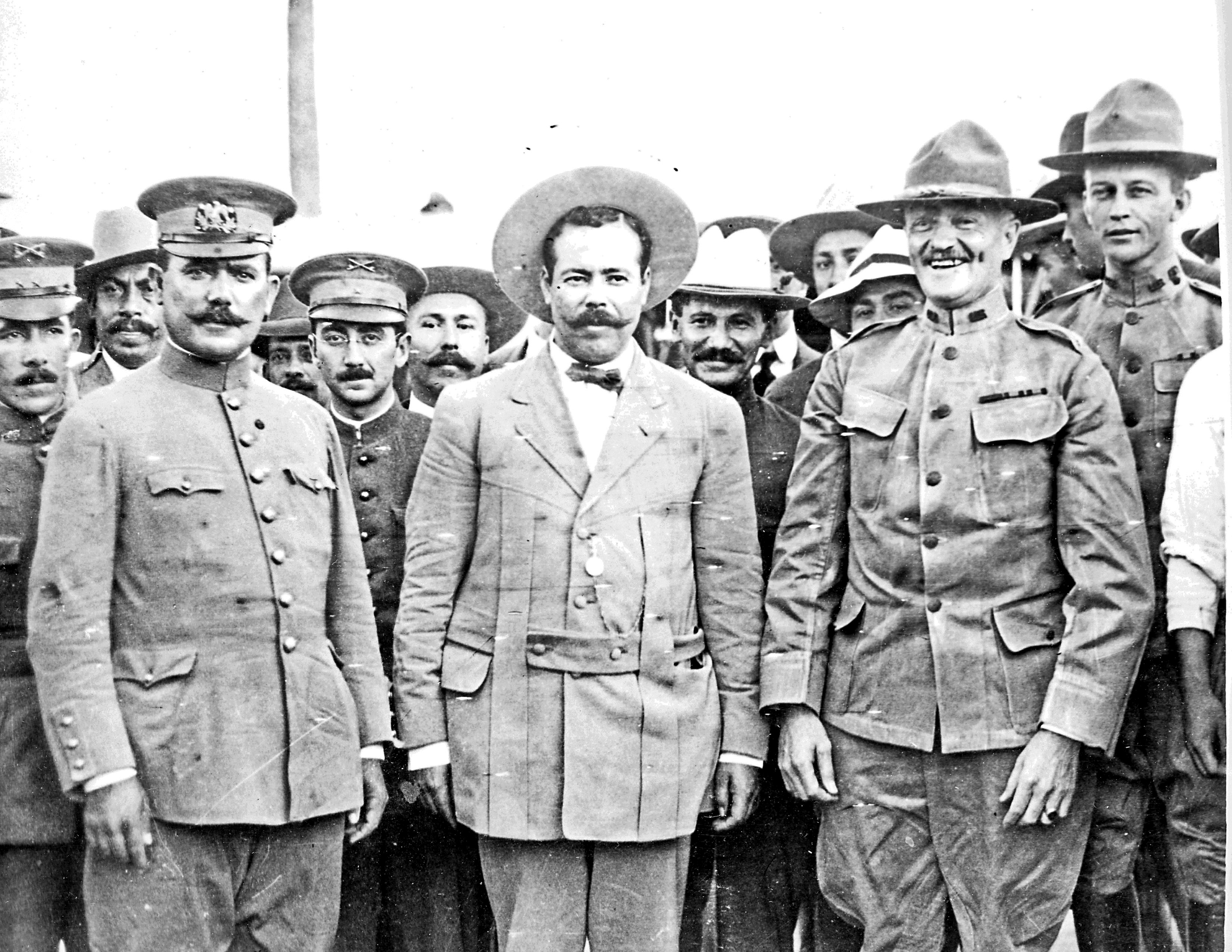
Front row, L-R: Mexican Generals Álvaro Obregón and Pancho Villa with American General John J. Pershing. Second row, far right: Pershing aide Lt. (future General) George S. Patton. At Fort Bliss, Texas, 1914.

Madero took office in November 1911 but was overthrown and murdered in February 1913 during the Ten Tragic Days. General Victoriano Huerta, who had served as Madero’s military commander, seized power with the support of conservatives, the old federal army and U.S ambassador Henry Lane Wilson. Carranza, then governor of Coahuila, refused to recognize him and issued the Plan of Guadalupe, launching the Constitutionalist movement. Villa, Alvaro Obregón, and other northern leaders soon joined the fight against Huerta.

Border clashes continued under the new alignment. In March 1913 Constitutionalist forces under Obregón took Nogales, Sonora; the federal commander Emilio Kosterlitzky surrendered his remnant to the U.S. garrison in Nogales, Arizona.

=== Occupation of Veracruz ===
Woodrow Wilson refused to recognize Huerta. The immediate pretexts were the Tampico Affair of April 1914 and reports that the German steamer Ypiranga was about to land munitions for Huerta at Veracruz. On 21 April 1914 U.S. forces under Brigadier General Frederick Funston occupied the port. Funston served as military governor until the withdrawal on 23 November. The occupation cut Huerta off from overseas arms. Constitutionalist forces later controlled the port after Huerta resigned and fled in July 1914.

=== After Huerta’s fall ===
Huerta’s defeat did not end the fighting. The revolutionaries split at the Convention of Aguascalientes. Villa and the Conventionists turned against Carranza’s Constitutionalists. From October 1914 into January 1915 Villa’s forces besieged the Constitutionalist garrison at Naco, Sonora, for 119 days. U.S. troops in Naco, Arizona, took casualties from overs and were ordered not to advance.

In the same summer Pascual Orozco, the former Maderista who had later supported Huerta, was killed with several companions by a Texas posse near High Lonesome while attempting to cross into Mexico. The circumstances of the shooting remain disputed.

== 1915–early 1916 ==
=== Plan of San Diego ===
In January 1915 authorities recovered a manifesto dated at San Diego, Texas. The Plan of San Diego called for an uprising of Mexicans, Tejanos, African Americans, and Indians, the killing of adult Anglo males, and a republic on the lands Mexico ceded in 1848. Field leaders in the Lower Valley were Luis de la Rosa and Aniceto Pizaña. Frederick Funston, commanding the Southern Department from Fort Sam Houston, oversaw the army’s response while George Bell Jr. commanded field troops in the Brownsville sector.

On 8 August 1915 a party of several dozen men, some of them later identified as Carrancista soldiers, attacked the Norias division headquarters of the King Ranch. A mixed garrison of Rangers, soldiers, and ranch hands held the buildings; Manuela Flores, a ranch worker, was killed and several defenders wounded. Photographs of Rangers posed with the dead were circulated in the Valley.

On 27 September 1915 Rangers under Capt. Henry Ransom shot Jesús Bazán and Antonio Longoria, prominent Hidalgo County ranchers who had ridden in to report a theft; the bodies were left in the brush.

On 21 October, two days after Wilson's de facto recognition of Carranza, raiders hit the Army Signal Corps station at Ojo de Agua. Three soldiers and one civilian were killed before a 3rd Cavalry relief column drove the attackers back across the river. After that date the large raids fell off.

Charles Harris and Louis R. Sadler argue that Carranza used the sediciosos to extract U.S. de facto recognition, then shut the raids down and briefly revived pressure in 1916 against Pershing. Benjamin Heber Johnson treats the rising as a Tejano social revolt that Carrancistas fed.

=== La Matanza ===
The raids killed Anglo civilians. The larger death toll in the Valley was on the other side of the line of suspicion. Tejanos called the years that followed la matanza ("the massacre"). Rangers of the newly expanded force, county posses, and ranch guards treated "Mexican" as a suspect category, citizen or not, and killed by proximity to a raid as often as by evidence.

After Norias, commercial photographs of Rangers posed over bound corpses were sold in Brownsville. Towns asked the Army for guards against the Rangers as well as against raiders. In 1919 José Tomás Canales forced the legislature to hear the record. The force was cut. No one was convicted.

A U.S. Army compilation printed after the fact listed more than three hundred Mexicans and Mexican Americans summarily executed in South Texas during 1915–16. Johnson, working from that record and from the Canales hearings, writes of "the killings of hundreds, possibly thousands" between 1915 and 1920. Exact totals remain contested; many dead were never named in a civil register.

== Columbus and the Punitive Expedition, 1916–1917 ==
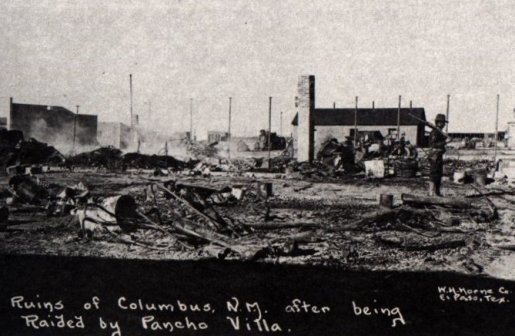
Columbus, New Mexico, after Pancho Villa's attack on the border town

Wilson's recognition of Carranza, U.S. rail movement of Carrancista troops, and searchlights at Douglas during the Second Battle of Agua Prieta left Villa convinced that Washington had chosen his enemy. On 1 December 1915 Villistas struck Nogales, Sonora; the U.S. 12th Infantry in Nogales, Arizona, exchanged fire. On 10 January 1916 Villistas stopped a train near Santa Isabel, Chihuahua, and killed eighteen American mining employees.

On 9 March 1916 a Villista column of several hundred attacked Columbus, New Mexico, and Camp Furlong of the 13th Cavalry. The raiders were driven out after hours of fighting. Friedrich Katz argued that Villa believed Wilson had struck a bargain that would turn Mexico into a protectorate, and that the raid was meant to force a U.S.–Carranza war. A parallel claim, older than Katz's, held that German agents, above all the arms buyer Felix A. Sommerfeld, pushed Villa into Columbus to force an American war. James A. Sandos argued that chain in 1970. Katz, with a wider archive, treated the German paper trail as real and thin: Sommerfeld bought cartridges and talked to every faction and that Villa took arms from whoever would sell them.

Wilson sent Pershing into Chihuahua with about 4,800 men, later near 10,000. The column never saw Villa. In the same months:

- Parral, 12 April 1916. After Carrancista authorities had initially received them, Maj. Frank Tompkins’s troops of the 13th Cavalry were attacked on the outskirts by townspeople shouting “Viva Villa” and by soldiers. Two Americans and several dozen Mexicans were killed. Local Mexican memory, including accounts of Elisa Griensen, emphasizes civilian resistance.

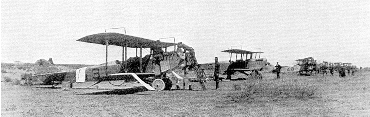
The 1st Aero Squadron in 1916 which was deployed during the expedition

- Glenn Springs and Boquillas, Texas, 5 May 1916. A Villista party killed three soldiers and several civilians at Glenn Springs. A U.S. column crossed after captives and recovered them at El Pino, Chihuahua.
- San Miguelito, May 1916. A motorized detachment including Lt. George S. Patton killed Julio Cárdenas, one of Villa's captains, and two others.
- San Ygnacio, Texas, 15 June and 31 July 1916. Raids killed U.S. soldiers and a customs inspector on the river.
- Battle of Carrizal, 21 June 1916. Captains Charles T. Boyd and Lewis S. Morey, Troops C and K of the 10th Cavalry, rode toward a Carrancista town against orders that U.S. troops move only north. Boyd attacked. General Félix Uresti Gómez was killed; so were Boyd, Lt. Henry R. Adair, and about a dozen troopers; twenty-four Americans were captured. Pershing asked to strike Chihuahua City. Wilson refused.

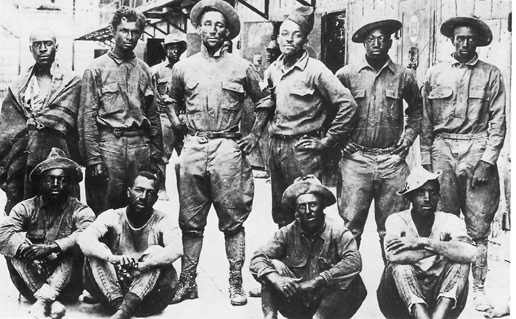
Buffalo Soldiers of the American 10th Cavalry Regiment who were taken prisoner during the Battle of Carrizal in 1916

Katz called the expedition "both a political and a military disaster." He also describes a resurgence of Villismo in late 1916. Wounded and written off after Celaya and Agua Prieta, Villa used the presence of U.S. troops to recast himself as the enemy of a foreign occupation. Crowds at Parral in April shouted "Viva Villa" at Tompkins's men. On the night of 15 September 1916 his forces partly occupied Chihuahua City. Pershing and Carrancista commanders still judged that much of the Chihuahuan countryside favored him into late 1916. The revival was guerrilla and regional; it did not restore the División del Norte. Carranza collected the same anti-American anger. After the last U.S. units crossed north on 5 February 1917, Villa's claim that Carranza had sold the country to Wilson was harder to sustain.

The National Guard call-up of 1916 put more than 100,000 men on the line.

== 1917–1918 ==
=== Zimmermann telegram and alleged German involvement ===
German policy in Mexico was active and limited. Berlin sold or licensed arms to Huerta, talked to Orozco, Villa, and Carranza in turn, and hoped a U.S.–Mexican war would pin American troops on the border. Katz concluded that German intrigue in Mexico was real and the paper trail thin: Germany was not the motor of the Revolution and it did not place German forces on the Rio Grande.

The same holds for the Plan of San Diego. Contemporary officers and some consuls blamed German or Japanese agents. No archive has shown Berlin writing or paying for the 1915 raids.

British intelligence gave Wilson the Zimmermann Telegram in early 1917: if the United States entered the European war, Germany would support a Mexican attempt to recover Texas, New Mexico, and Arizona. Carranza took counsel, kept the door ajar while Pershing was still in Chihuahua, and refused the alliance once the note was public. The formal rejection reached the German minister in April 1917. Mexico stayed neutral.

=== Yaqui war spillover ===
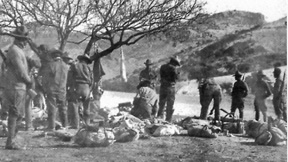
Yaqui prisoners and 10th Cavalry troops on 9 January 1918, after the skirmish in Bear Valley, Arizona

On 9 January 1918 the 10th Cavalry fought a Yaqui party in the Battle of Bear Valley in Arizona.

=== Porvenir Massacre ===
On the night of 28 January, Rangers of Company B, local ranchers, and 8th Cavalry soldiers took fifteen unarmed ethnic Mexican men and boys from Porvenir and shot them. Canales forced legislative hearings in 1919; the Ranger force was trimmed.

=== Battle of Ambos Nogales ===
On 27 August 1918 a customs incident at Ambos Nogales became a street battle between the U.S. 35th Infantry and 10th Cavalry and Mexican federal troops. Mexican casualty figures vary widely across reports; U.S. dead were fewer. Contemporary U.S. accounts and some newspapers claimed that German officers were present with the Mexican forces and helped direct the fighting. No archival evidence has substantiated those claims. A more permanent fence followed between the two Nogales.

== 1919 ==
=== Villa's final battle ===
On 15–16 June 1919 Villistas attacked Ciudad Juárez. Stray fire crossed into El Paso, killing and wounding several Americans. Brigadier General James B. Erwin, commanding at Fort Bliss, ordered U.S. artillery to shell Villista positions at the Juárez racetrack and sent a cavalry brigade and infantry of the 24th Infantry across the river. The American troops, together with Carrancista forces, drove the Villistas out of the city and returned to the U.S. side the same day. Villa took amnesty from Adolfo de la Huerta in 1920 and was assassinated at Parral in 1923.

=== Candelaria incursion ===
In August 1919 Jesús Rentería seized two U.S. Border Air Patrol pilots who had crashed south of Candelaria, Texas. After a ransom was arranged, troops of the 8th Cavalry crossed at Candelaria, Ruidosa, and Indio on 19 August. The Handbook of Texas treats the crossing as the last American punitive expedition into Mexico during the Revolution. The cavalry camp at Candelaria closed the next month.

== Aftermath ==
The Canales hearings of 1919 recorded Ranger killings in South Texas. Johnson follows the same years into the early politics of the League of United Latin American Citizens. Diplomacy moved to oil, claims, and the Bucareli talks of 1923. Hall and Coerver noted that trade and investment across the line often increased while columns crossed it.

== See also ==
- United States involvement in the Mexican Revolution
- Previous border conflicts
  - Long Expedition (1819–1821)
  - Fredonian Rebellion (1826–1827)
  - Capture of Monterey (1842)
  - William Walker's Expedition (1853–1854)
  - Battle of Caborca (1857)
  - Cortina Troubles (1859–1861)
  - San Elizario Salt War (1877–1878)
  - Crawford affair (1886)
  - Garza Revolution (1891–1893)
  - Nogales Uprising (1896)
