= Henry R. Adair =

American cavalry officer (1882–1916)

Henry Rodney Adair
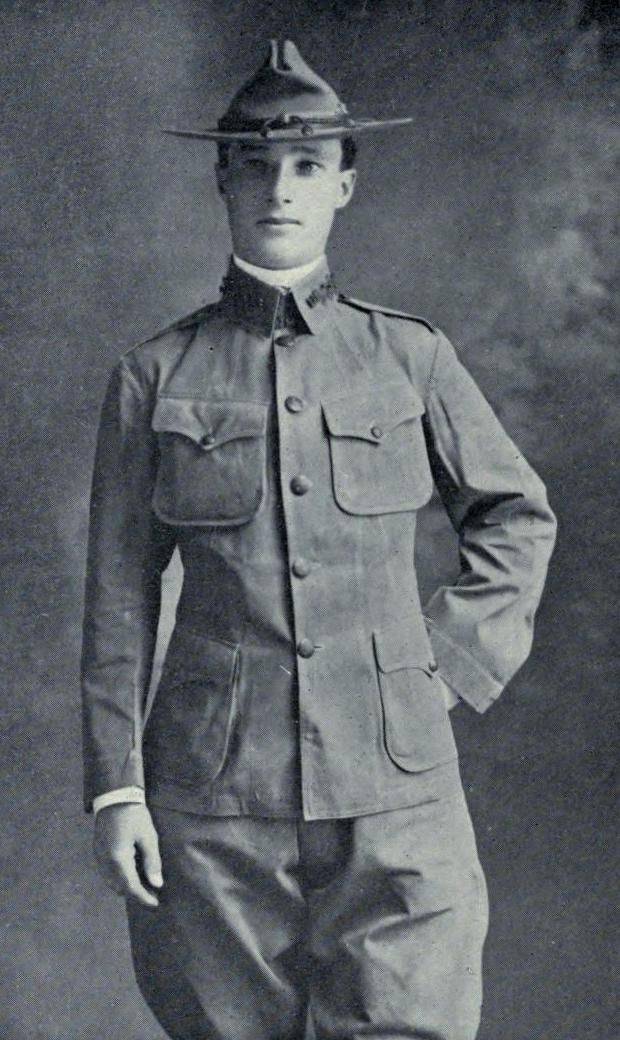
- Born: April 13, 1882; Astoria, Oregon, United States
- Died: June 21, 1916 (aged 34); Carrizal, Chihuahua, Mexico
- Burial place: River View Cemetery (Portland, Oregon)
- Military career
- Allegiance: United States
- Branch: United States Army
- Service years: 1904–1916
- Rank: First Lieutenant
- Commands: 10th Cavalry Regiment
- Conflicts: Mexican Revolution: Battle of Carrizal †

Henry Rodney Adair (1882–1916) was an American cavalry officer. He is most notable for his participation in the Battle of Carrizal of the Pancho Villa Expedition.

== Biography ==
Adair was born in Astoria, Oregon, on April 13, 1882. He was a part of a prominent Oregon pioneer family. He graduated from West Point on June 15, 1904, and served in various areas of the U.S. and overseas, including the Philippines as Adair served in Fort William McKinley from May 1908 until May 1909. He served with the 10th Cavalry Regiment from the outset of his career with periodic duties in other areas of the U.S., including Fort Ethan Allen in Colchester, Vermont, from 1909 to 1913, then the Regiment was transferred to Fort Huachuca, Arizona. He served there and along the Mexican Border until 1914 in response to the Mexican Revolution, then back to Fort Riley from 1914 to 1915, and returned to Arizona in 1915 until 1916.

He was a famous horseman and polo player, traveling to Canada, Egypt and Gibraltar in this capacity while serving in the cavalry. He was promoted to 1st lieutenant on June 26, 1911.

In the late spring of 1916, he served with C Troop, 10th Cavalry Regiment, with Captain Charles T. Boyd in General Pershing's "Punitive Expedition to Mexico" in search of Pancho Villa and his troops who had recently raided across the Border into New Mexico. He served from March 16 until his death on June 21, 1916, on this campaign.

The last task of the expedition was to scout around Villa Ahumada, Chihuahua, Mexico "to recon in the vicinity of the Santa Domingo Ranch" and avoid any confrontation with the Carrancistas. This was about 60 miles east of Colonia Dubla where the main U.S. Army camp was set.

However, it was at Carrizal, Chihuahua that the American troops came face to face with a much larger force of Carranza's Mexican troops, and a confrontation began. He was killed during the ensuing Battle of Carrizal in a hail of gunfire from the Carrancistas. Adair would later be buried in River View Cemetery in Portland, Oregon.

== Legacy ==
Camp Adair in Oregon is named after Henry R. Adair as he was a native of Astoria.
