= Genovevo Rivas Guillén =

Mexican general

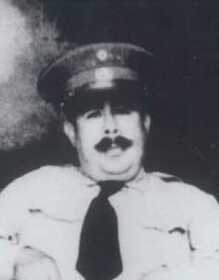
- Born: January 3, 1886; Rayón, San Luis Potosí, Mexico
- Died: March 20, 1947 (aged 61) Potrero de Para, San Luis Potosí, Mexico
- Allegiance: Mexico
- Rank: General
- Conflicts: Mexican Revolution; Battle of Carrizal; Cristero War
- Awards: Heroic Valor Award (1924)

Genevevo Rivas Guillén (1886–1947) was a Mexican general and provisional Governor of San Luis Potosi.

== Origin ==
Rivas was born in Rayon, San Luis Potosí in 1886. He joined the revolutionary forces and participated in the Mexican Revolution beginning in 1910, under the command of General Alberto Carrera Torres, where he was ranked lieutenant.

== Battle of Carrizal ==
On June 21, 1916, during the Punitive Expedition, a column of the U.S. Army under the command of Captain Charles T. Boyd were marching towards Rancho Santo Domingo from Villa Ahumada, Chihuahua, overstepped the geographic limits granted to the Americans when the Mexican government of Venustiano Carranza approved the expedition. Lieutenant Rivas's forces, at the garrison at the nearby town of Carrizal, moved to block them and request their return to the authorized area. Captain Boyd refused, claiming he was pursuing an Army deserter. Rivas requested help from his superior, requesting their return, so Captain Boyd refused, and warned that going after a U.S. Army deserter, requesting the presence of his superior, General Félix Gómez. Gómez supported his subordinate, starting a battle in which General Gómez died, with Rivas in command. Lieutenant Rivas defeated the Americans and forced them to retreat.

U.S. casualties were 50 soldiers killed, along with the capture of 27 prisoners, 22 horses and weapons; Mexico lost only 27 men, and 39 soldiers were wounded. In 1924, he received the Heroic Valor Award.

== Later years ==
As commander of Military Zone XIV, he fought against the Cristeros during the Cristero War in the states of Jalisco and San Luis Potosi; he was then promoted to brigadier general in 1938 after he fought against the rebellion of General Saturnino Cedillo.

He became governor of his state and military commander of the states of Querétaro, Oaxaca and Sonora. Subsequently, to retire from the army, he devoted himself to agriculture. Rivas died of drowning in Potrero de Para, San Luis Potosi, in 1947.
