= General Gómez =

General Gómez may refer to:

- Félix Uresti Gómez (1887—1916), Mexican revolutionary forces general
- José Domingo Molina Gómez (1896–1969), Argentine Army general
- Juan Vicente Gómez (1857–1935), Venezuelan Army general
- Leandro Gómez (1811–1865), Uruguayan Army general
- Máximo Gómez (1836–1905), Dominican-born major general in Cuba's Ten Years' War with Spain

== See also ==
- John Gomes (officer) (fl. 1970s–2010s), Bangladesh Army major general
