= Pancho Villa Expedition =

1916–17 US Army operation into Mexico

- Part of the Mexican Revolution, Border War
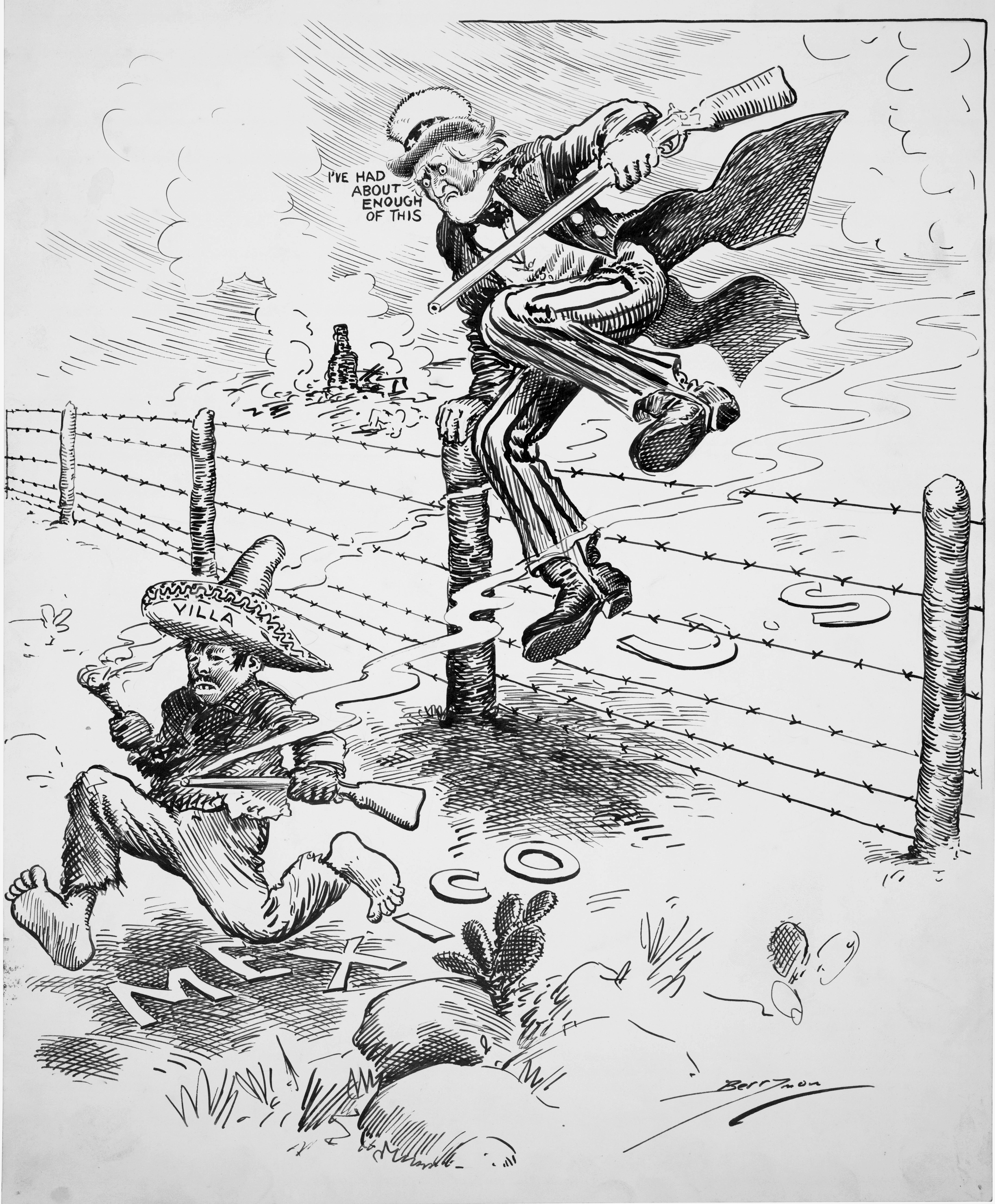
- Cartoon by Clifford K. Berryman reflecting American attitudes about the expedition
Date	March 14, 1916 – February 7, 1917 (10 months, 3 weeks and 3 days)
Location	State of Chihuahua, Mexico
Result	See § Aftermath

Belligerents
United States	Conventionists: División del Norte; Constitutionalists: Constitutional Army

Commanders and leaders
Woodrow Wilson; John J. Pershing	Pancho Villa Álvaro Obregón

Strength
c. 10,000	c. 500 (Conventionists) 22,000 (Constitutionalists)

Casualties and losses
65 killed; 67 wounded; 3 missing; 24 captured (Note: Both US and Mexican casualties as of June 30, 1916, following end of active US operations)	Conventionists: 169 killed; 115+ wounded; 19 captured; Constitutionalists: 82 killed; 51+ wounded

Punitive Expedition
American Advance
headquarters for the Operation
Battles

General John J. Pershing in his camp at Colonia Dublán, studying telegraphed orders

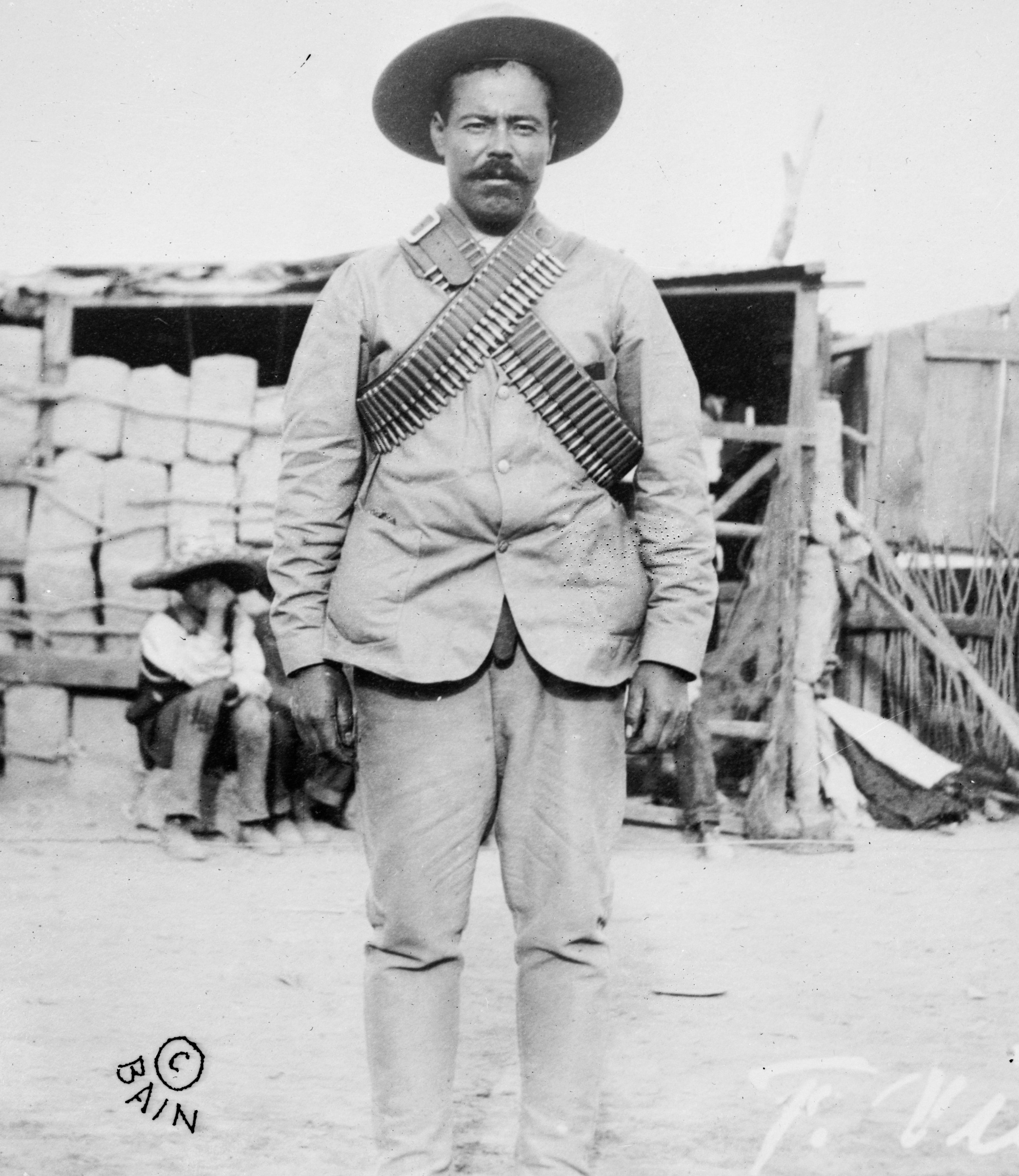
Pancho Villa wearing bandoliers in front of an insurgent camp

The Pancho Villa Expedition, now known officially in the United States as the Mexican Expedition but originally referred to as the "Punitive Expedition, US Army," was a military operation conducted by the United States Army against the paramilitary forces of Mexican revolutionary Francisco "Pancho" Villa from March 14, 1916, to February 7, 1917, during the Mexican Revolution of 1910–1920.

The expedition was launched in retaliation for Villa's attack on the town of Columbus, New Mexico, an incident of the larger Mexican Border War. The declared objective of the expedition by the administration of US President Woodrow Wilson was the capture of Villa. Despite locating and defeating the main body of Villa's command who were responsible for the Columbus raid, US forces were unable to achieve Wilson's stated main objective of preventing Villa's escape.

The active search for Villa ended after a month in the field when troops sent by Venustiano Carranza, the head of the Constitutionalist faction of the revolution and then head of the Mexican government, resisted the US incursion. The Constitutionalist forces used arms at the town of Parral to resist passage of a US Army column. The US mission was changed to prevent further attacks on it by Mexican troops and to plan for the possibility of war. When war was averted diplomatically, the expedition remained in Mexico until February 1917 to encourage Carranza's government to pursue Villa and prevent further raids across the border.

== Background ==
Trouble between the United States and Pancho Villa had been growing since October 1915, when the United States government officially recognized Villa's rival and former ally Venustiano Carranza as head of the government of Mexico. The US also provided rail transportation through the United States, from Eagle Pass, Texas, to Douglas, Arizona, to move more than 5,000 Carrancista forces to fight Villa at the Battle of Agua Prieta; Villa's seasoned División del Norte was smashed. Feeling betrayed, Villa began attacking US nationals and their property in northern Mexico. On November 26, 1915, Villa sent a force to attack the city of Nogales and in the course of the ensuing battle, engaged with American forces before withdrawing.

On January 11, 1916, sixteen American employees of the American Smelting and Refining Company were removed from a train near Santa Isabel, Chihuahua, and summarily stripped and executed. Brigadier General John J. Pershing, commanding the district headquartered at Fort Bliss, Texas, received information that Villa with a new force was on the border and about to make an attack that would force the United States to intervene, embarrassing the Carranza government. (Note: Katz asserts that putting the Carranza government into a no-win dilemma by forcing the United States to militarily intervene in Mexico was Villa's primary motivation for both Columbus and all the "outrages" preceding it. (Katz, 1978)) Raids were so commonplace, however, that the rumor was not seen as credible. Local lore in Columbus holds that the attack may have been caused by a merchant in Columbus who supplied Villa with arms and ammunition. Villa is said to have paid several thousand dollars in cash for the weapons, but the merchant refused to deliver them unless he was paid in gold, giving "cause" for the raid.

At about 4:00 am on March 9, 1916, Villa's troops attacked Columbus, New Mexico, and Camp Furlong, the US Army post there, where four troops (about 240 soldiers) of the 13th Cavalry Regiment had been stationed since September 1912. The raiders burned the town, stole horses and mules, and seized machine guns, ammunition, and merchandise before fleeing back to Mexico. Ten civilians and eight soldiers were killed in the attack, and two civilians and six soldiers wounded.

Villa's soldiers had suffered considerable losses, with at least 67 dead and dozens more wounded. Many of the casualties were inflicted when the machine gun troop of the 13th Cavalry led by 2nd Lt. John P. Lucas set up its light machine guns under fire along the north boundary of Camp Furlong, firing over 5,000 rounds apiece by the glow of burning buildings to illuminate targets. (Note: Lucas fought the entire 90-minute action bare-footed, injuring the soles of his feet. (Tompkins, 51)) About 13 of Villa's wounded later died of their wounds, and five wounded Villistas taken prisoner by the Americans were tried and hanged for murder.

The next day, acting on the recommendations of the commanders of his cavalry regiments, Southern Department commanding general Frederick Funston recommended an immediate pursuit in force into Mexico. US President Woodrow Wilson concurred, designating Pershing to command the force and releasing a statement to the press:

An adequate force will be sent at once in pursuit of Villa with the single object of capturing him and putting a stop to his forays. This can and will be done in entirely friendly aid to the constituted authorities in Mexico and with scrupulous respect for the sovereignty of that Republic.

== Expedition ==
=== Pursuit phase ===
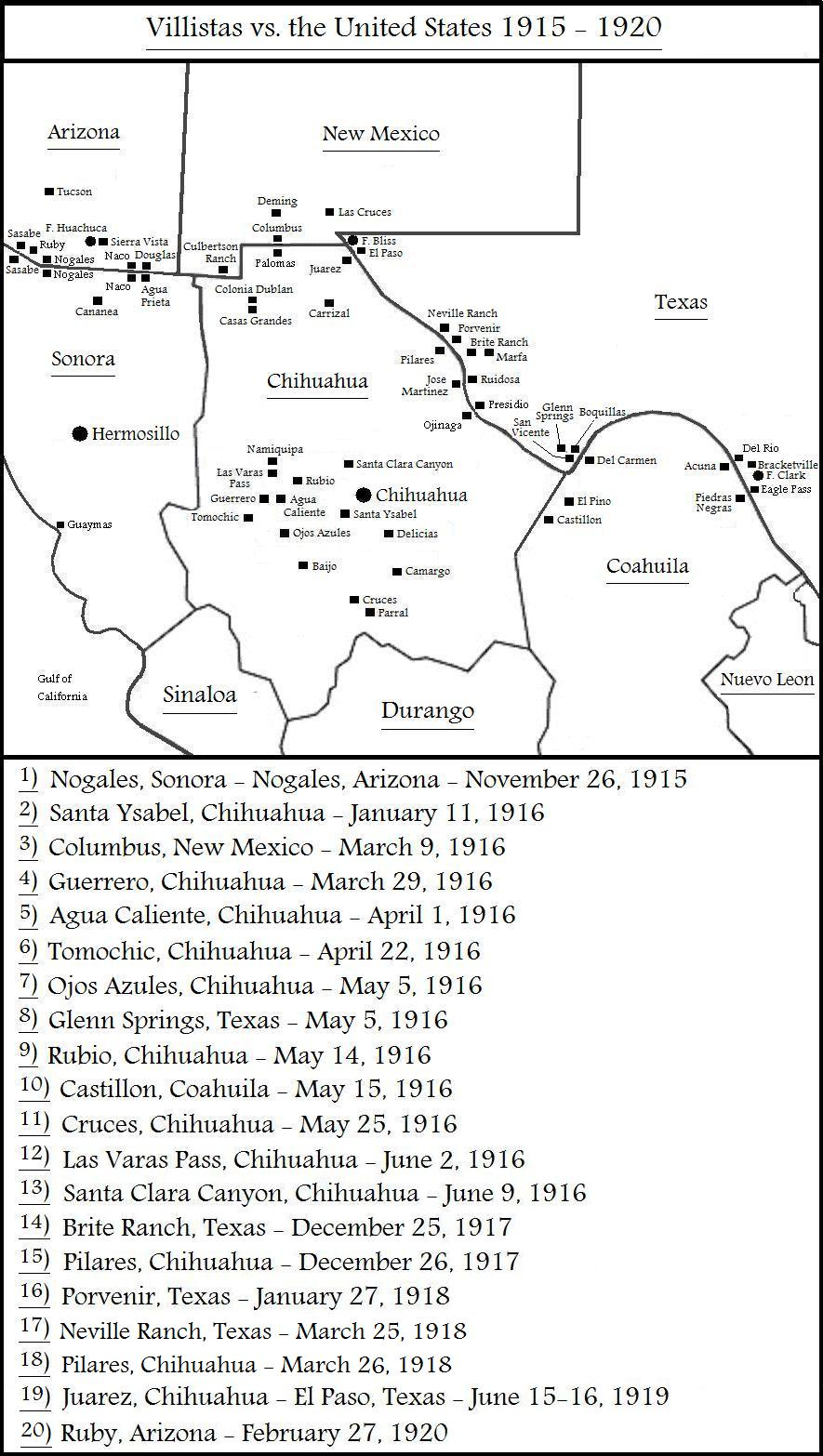

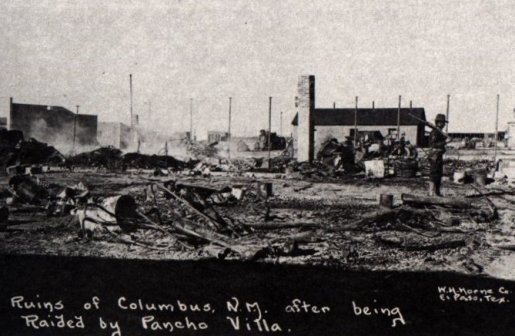
Battle of Columbus. Ruins of Columbus, New Mexico, after being raided by Pancho Villa

Pershing assembled an expeditionary force consisting primarily of cavalry and horse artillery, the cavalry units being armed with M1909 machine guns, M1903 Springfield rifles, and M1911 semi-automatic pistols. On March 15, 1916, organized into a provisional division of three brigades (four regiments of cavalry, (Note: Of the four cavalry regiments, only the 11th was at full strength. The 7th and 13th had just seven of their 12 rifle troops and the 10th only ten. The five-day journey by train from Georgia so debilitated the mounts of the 11th Cavalry (ten died on the march from Columbus to Dublán) that it formed two provisional squadrons using selected horses to conduct field operations.) two of infantry, and 6,600 men), the expedition crossed the border into Mexico to search for Villa, marching in two columns from Columbus and Culberson's Ranch. (Note: The eastern column left Columbus as originally planned at midday of March 15. In recognition of its fight at Columbus, the 13th Cavalry was specified to lead the column and crossed the border ceremonially (regimental standard first) just after noon. Pershing was delayed reaching the western column at Culberson's, which did not march until after midnight March 16. (Tompkins, 74–77))

The 2nd Provisional Cavalry Brigade reached Colonia Dublán after dark on March 17, where Pershing established the main base of operations for the campaign. The 1st Aero Squadron, included in the expedition for liaison duties and aerial reconnaissance on the orders of United States Secretary of War Newton D. Baker, departed San Antonio, Texas, on March 13 by rail with eight Curtiss JN3 airplanes and flew the first aerial reconnaissance of the area from Columbus on March 16, the day after it arrived. The entire squadron flew to the advanced camp at Colonia Dublán on March 19–20, losing two aircraft in the process. (Note: The entire squadron was forced by darkness to land before reaching Colonia Dublán. One of the Jennies came down in the desert south of Casas Grandes and was so severely vandalized that only the engine could be salvaged. The second arrived the next morning but crashed in a cross-wind while landing.)

Pershing immediately sent the 7th Cavalry (seven troops in two squadrons) south just after midnight on March 18 to begin the pursuit, followed by the 10th Cavalry moving by rail two days later. From March 20 to March 30, as the 11th Cavalry arrived in Columbus by train from Fort Oglethorpe, Georgia, and then forced marched into Mexico, Pershing dispatched four additional "flying columns" through the mountainous territory into the gaps between the original three columns. (Note: The four columns were by marching dates: (March 20) Major Elmer Lindsley with 2nd Squadron and Troop L, 13th Cavalry; (March 21) Major Frank Tompkins with Troops K, M and Machine Gun Troop, 13th, and Troops I and K, 10th Cavalry; (March 24), Major Robert Howze with the 1st Provisional Squadron, 11th Cavalry, and (March 30) Col. H. T. Allen and 2nd Provisional Squadron, 11th Cavalry.) Persistent winter weather through early April, particularly bitterly cold nights at high altitude, made both pursuit and logistics more difficult. An additional regiment of cavalry and two of infantry were added to the expedition in late April, (Note: The 5th Cavalry and the 17th and 24th Infantry Regiments. The infantry was used as "line of communication" troops to protect the logistical network.) bringing its total size to 4,800 men. Ultimately more than 10,000 men—virtually every available unit of the Regular Army and additional National Guard troops—were committed to the expedition either in Mexico or its supporting units at Columbus.

Because of disputes with the Carranza administration over the use of the Mexico North Western Railway to supply Pershing's troops, the United States Army employed trucks to convoy supplies to the encampment where the Signal Corps also set up wireless telegraph service from the border to Pershing's headquarters. This was the first use of truck convoys in a US military operation and provided useful experience for World War I. (Note: The US Army ordered substantial numbers of four-wheel drive Jeffery Quad and all-wheel drive FWD Model B trucks for the expedition; The Army's order of 147 Four Wheel Drive Model B trucks allegedly saved the FWD company from bankruptcy. The GMC Model 15 3/4-ton truck was also being introduced at the time.) During this phase of the campaign Pershing maintained a small mobile headquarters of 30 men using a Dodge touring car for personal transportation, to keep abreast of the moving columns and control their movements, employing aircraft of the 1st Aero Squadron as messengers. His headquarters advanced as far as the 1st Aero Squadron's field at Satevó, southeast of the city of Chihuahua, before falling back at the end of April.

Villa had a six-day head start on the pursuit, all but ensuring that his forces would successfully break up into smaller bands and he would be able to hide in the trackless mountains. Nevertheless, he was nearly caught by the forced marches of the pursuing cavalry columns when he recklessly paused in his retreat to attack a Carrancista garrison. The Battle of Guerrero was fought on March 29, 1916, after a 55-mile night march through the snowy Sierra Madre by Colonel George A. Dodd and 370 men of the 7th Cavalry. 360 Villistas had remained in Guerrero celebrating the victory won over the Carrancista garrison (Note: Villa himself was shot in the lower leg during the earlier attack by a captured Carrancista impressed into service. The wound left him severely hobbled for months, so that when he reached Santa Cruz de Herrera in the far south of Chihuahua, he went into hiding there until the end of May.) and 160 more were in the next valley in nearby San Ysidro.

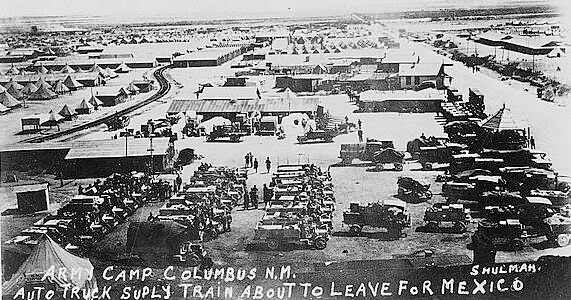
Staging area for truck trains that supplied troops of General John J. Pershing during the Pancho Villa Expedition, in Columbus, New Mexico

Dodd's force was unexpected by the Villistas, who hastily dispersed when the US troops appeared on the steep eastern bluffs overlooking the town. Dodd immediately attacked, sending one squadron west around the town to block escape routes and advancing with the other. A planned charge was thwarted when the fatigued horses were unable to attain the proper gait. (Note: The charge is widely but erroneously reported as having taken place. However even had it occurred, it would have been neither "the first mounted charge since the Spanish–American War" nor "the last true cavalry charge" as often claimed. A text-book mounted pistol charge was executed before Guerrero by two troops of the 13th Cavalry against Villa's rear guard in his immediate retreat from Columbus on March 9, while at least two charges took place after Guerrero: at Agua Caliente by two troops of the 10th Cavalry and at Ojo Azules by elements of the 11th Cavalry. (Tompkins, pp. 55–56)) During a five-hour pursuit of fleeing Villista elements, over 75 of Villa's men were killed or wounded and he was forced to retreat into the mountains. Only five of the Americans were hurt, none of them fatally. The battle is considered the single most successful engagement of the expedition and possibly the closest Pershing's men came to capturing Villa. (Note: Pershing's report (p. 14) states that the wounded Villa had left Guerrero the night before the battle because he was unable to ride a horse. The nearest Villa actually came to capture appears to have been on April 11, when the "picked squadron" of the 11th Cavalry under Howze was conducting a house-to-house search for him in Santa Cruz de Herrera near Parral while he was actually in hiding outside the pueblo only one-half mile away. (Pershing report, pp. 109–110))

After advancing from Namiquipa on March 24 to San Diego del Monte, the 10th Cavalry became isolated from Pershing's headquarters by a fierce snow storm on March 31. A squadron of the 10th marched toward Guerrero after receiving reports of the action there and at midday April 1 a meeting engagement resulted with one of the retreating Villista groups, 150 strong, under Francisco Beltrán at a ranch near Agua Caliente. Breaking up into even smaller groups and retreating over a wooded ridge, some of the Villistas attempted to defend themselves behind a stone wall, resulting in what was purported to be the first mounted cavalry charge by US troops since 1898, led by Major Charles Young. The pursuit lasted until darkness and the Buffalo Soldiers killed at least two Villistas left on the field and routed the remainder without loss. The action also was the first time the US Army used plunging fire by machine guns to support an attack.

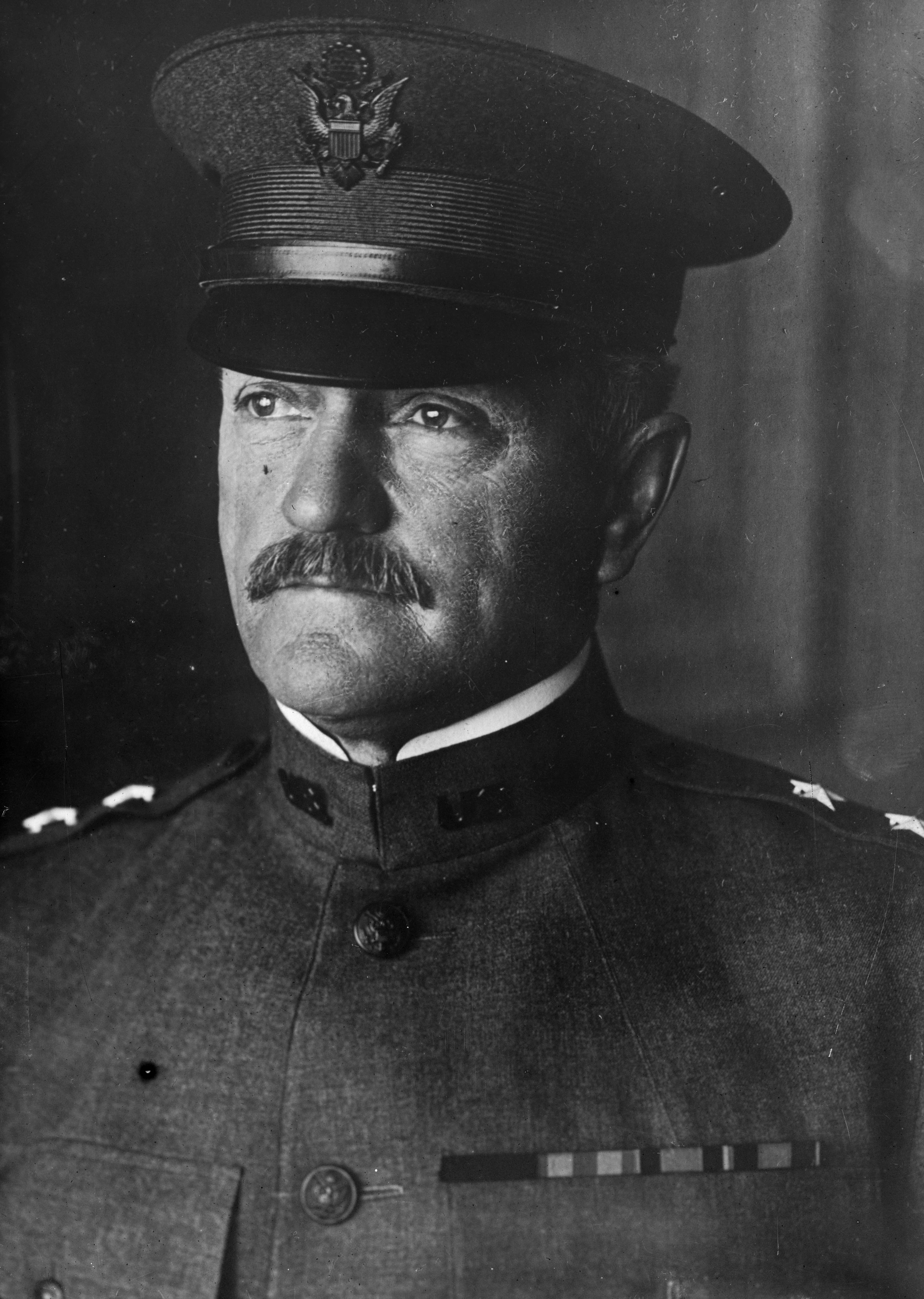
Maj. Gen. John Pershing of the National Army

The columns pushed deeper into Mexico, increasing tensions between the United States and the Carranza government. On April 12, 1916, Major Frank Tompkins and Troops K and M, 13th Cavalry, numbering 128 men, were attacked by an estimated 500 Mexican troops as they were leaving the town of Parral, 513 miles into Mexico and almost to the state of Durango, following violent protests by the civilian populace. (Note: Parral was a favored haven for Villa and the place where he was ultimately assassinated in 1923.) Tompkins had been personally ordered to avoid a straight-up engagement with de facto government troops to prevent war between the countries and so used a rear guard to keep the Carrancistas at a distance during a retreat to his starting point, the fortified village of Santa Cruz de Villegas. Two Americans were killed in the skirmishing, one was missing from the rear guard, and another six were wounded, while the Carrancistas lost between fourteen and seventy men, according to conflicting accounts.

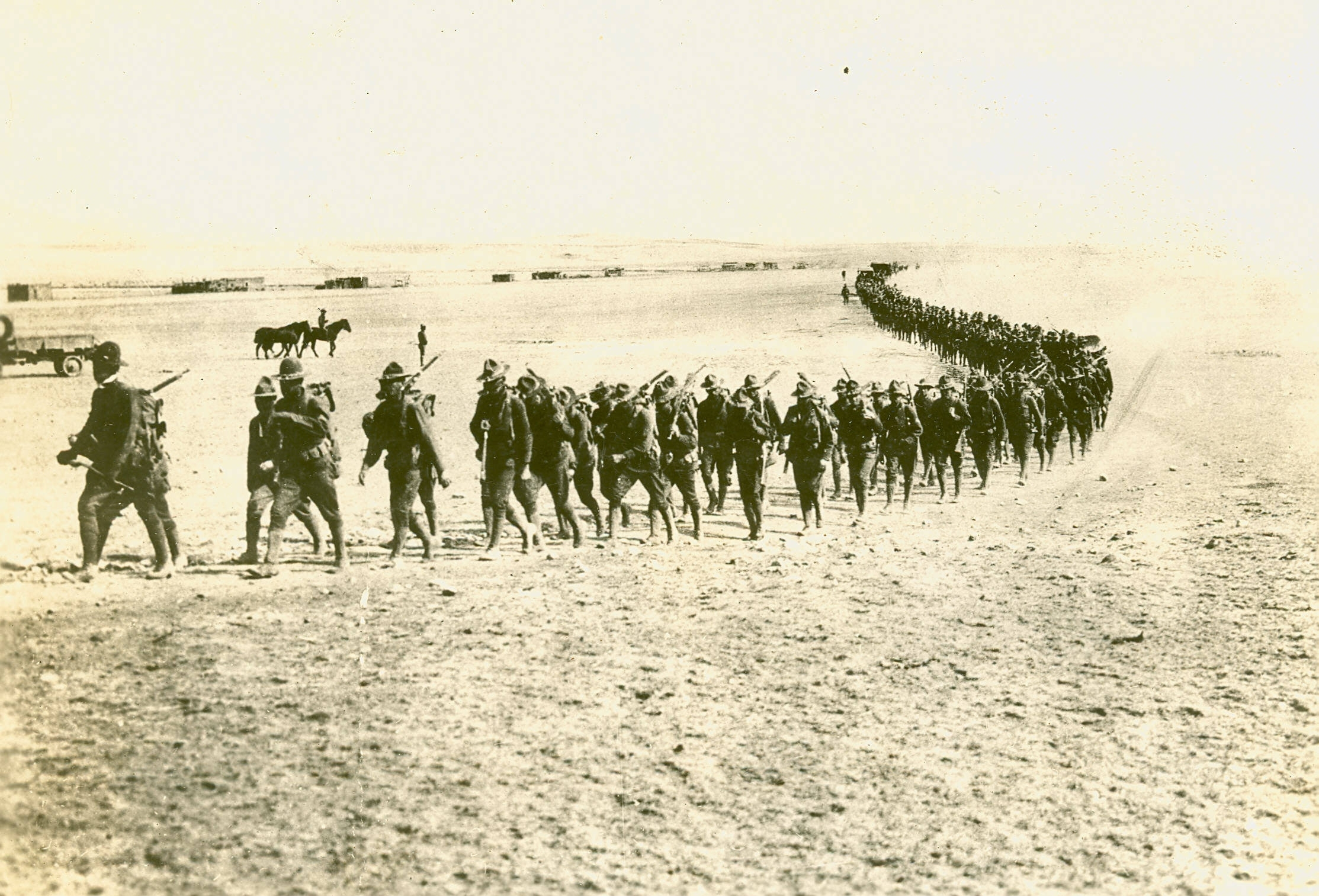
American soldiers cross the arid plains south of Columbus, New Mexico.

The battle marked a turning point in the campaign. Military opposition by Carranza forced a halt in further pursuit while diplomatic conversations took place by both nations to avoid war. Only four days earlier, on April 8, Army Chief of Staff General Hugh L. Scott had expressed to Secretary of War Baker that Pershing had virtually accomplished his mission and that it was "not dignified for the United States to be hunting one man in a foreign country". Baker concurred and so advised Wilson, but following the fight at Parral the administration refused to withdraw the expedition, not wanting to be seen as caving in to Mexican pressure during an election year. Instead, on April 21 Pershing ordered the four columns that had converged near Parral to withdraw to San Antonio de Los Arenales. A week later he assigned the cavalry regiments, including the newly arrived 5th Cavalry, to five districts created in central Chihuahua in which to patrol and seek out the smaller bands. (Note: This decentralization of operations and distribution of forces in small groups over a five-district area is similar to that Pershing successfully used in his last year (1913) as military governor of the Moro Province in the Philippines.)

While executing the withdrawal order, Dodd and a portion of the 7th Cavalry fought an engagement on April 22 with about 200 Villistas under Candelario Cervantes at the small village of Tomochic. As the Americans entered the village, the Mexicans opened fire from the surrounding hills. Dodd first sent patrols out to engage the Villistas' rear guard, to the east of Tomochic, and after these were "scattered", located the main body on a plain to the north and brought it into action. Skirmishing continued, but after dark the Villistas retreated and the Americans moved into Tomochic. The 7th Cavalry lost two men killed and four wounded, while Dodd reported his men had killed at least thirty Villistas.

=== Patrol district actions ===
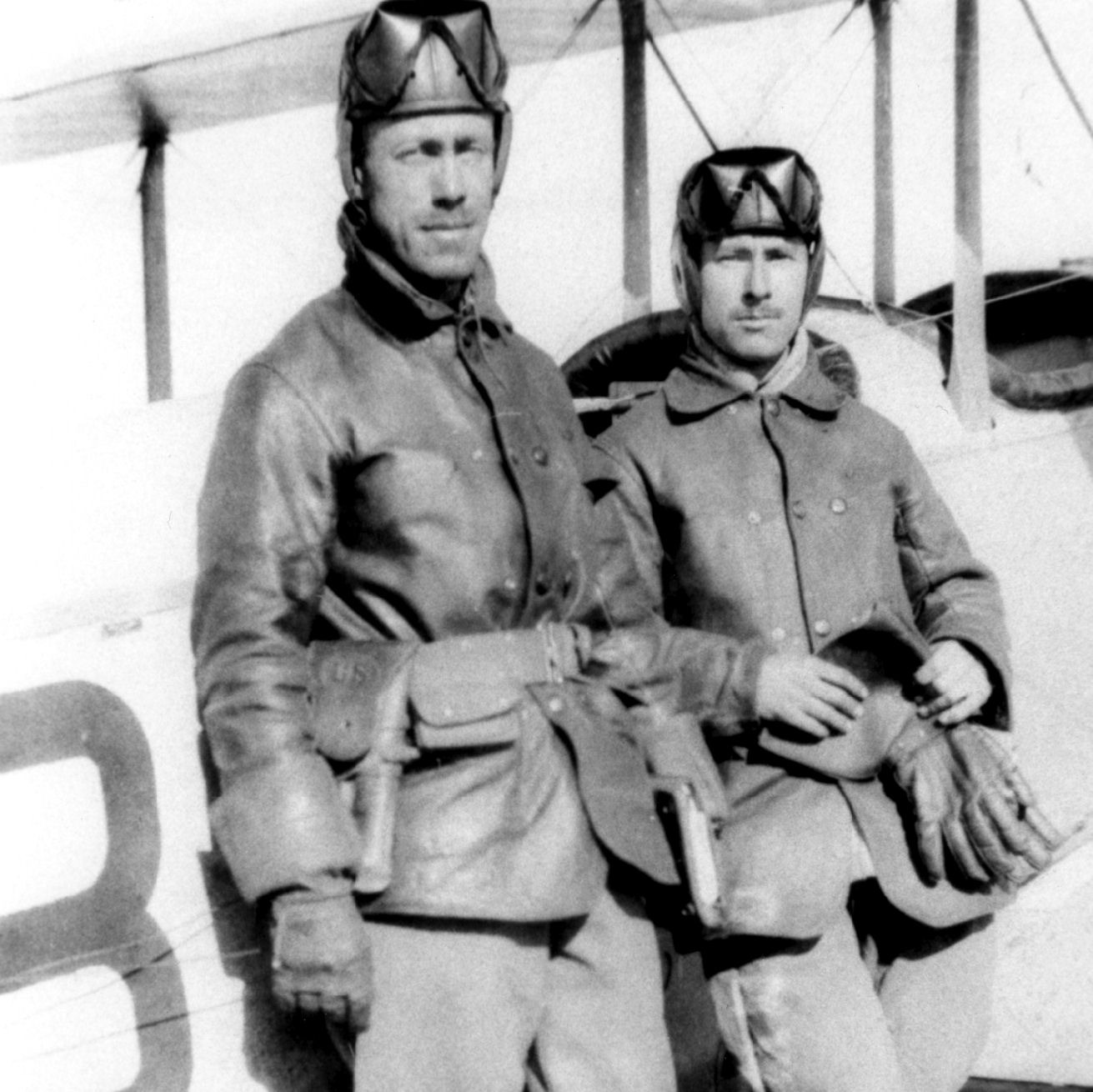
Lts. Herbert Dargue (left) and Edgar S. Gorrell (right) pose with Signal Corps No. 43. in 1916 with the 1st Aero Squadron in Mexico during the Pancho Villa Expedition

The five districts that Pershing established west of the Mexican Central Railway on April 29, 1916, were:

- Namiquipa District (10th Cavalry) south of the 30th parallel to Namiquipa;
- Bustillos District (13th Cavalry), below the eastern part of Namiquipa District around Laguna Bustillos to San Antonio de Los Arenales and Chihuahua City;
- Guerrero District (7th Cavalry), below the western part of Namiquipa District and west of the Bustillos and San Borja Districts;
- San Borja District (11th Cavalry), south of Bustillos District between the Guerrero and Satevó Districts to Parral; and
- Satevó District (5th Cavalry), southeast of the Bustillos District and east of the San Borja District, south to Jimenez.

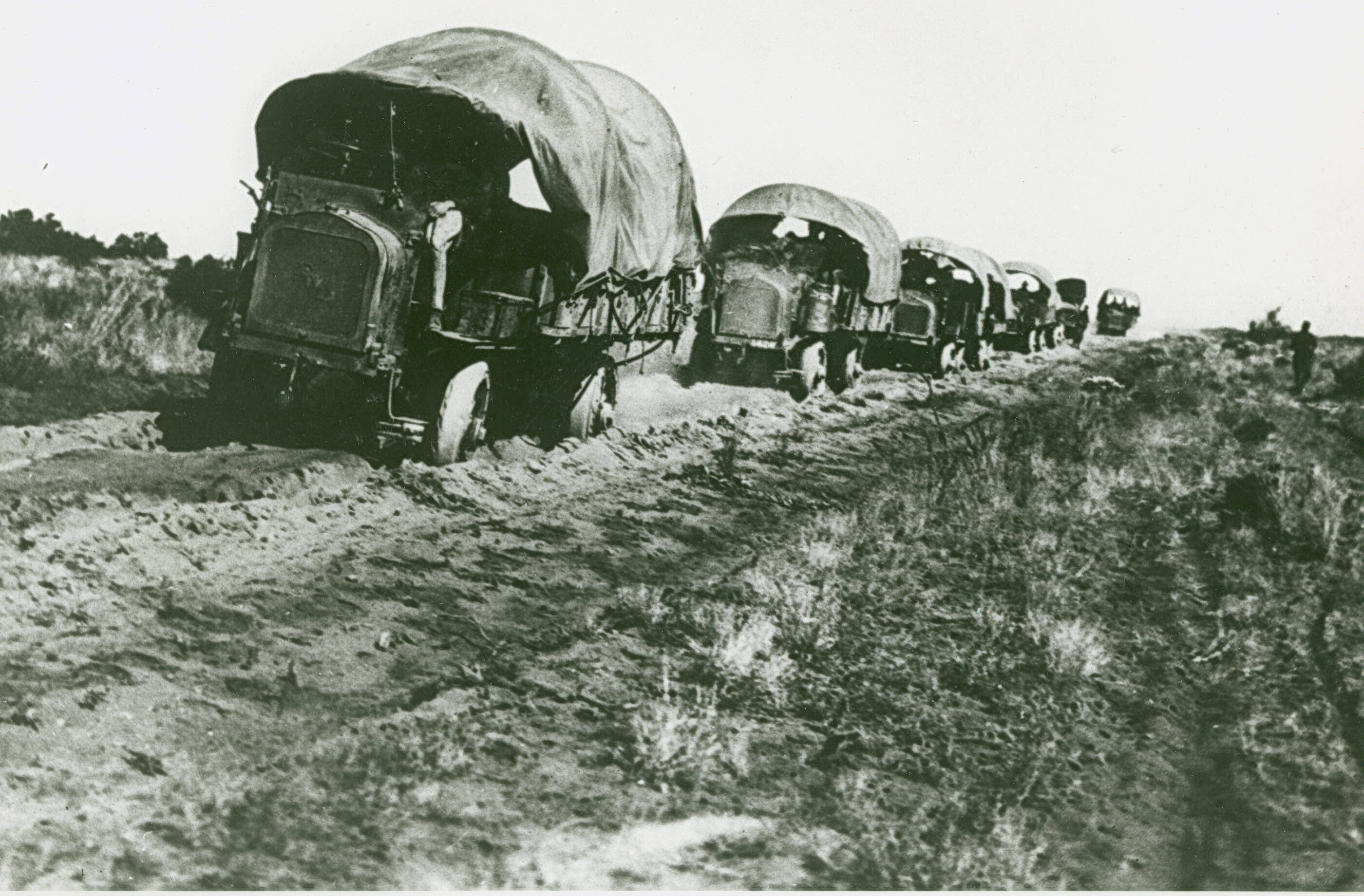
A motorized convoy makes its way down a rutted road.

The next significant engagement took place on May 5. A small Carrancista garrison at the silver mining town of Cusihuiriachic was attacked by Villa's forces on May 4, prompting the garrison commander to request help from US forces at nearby San Antonio. Six troops of the 11th Cavalry, (Note: Troops A, C, D, E, F, and G) its machine gun platoon, and a detachment of Apache Scouts under 1st Lt. James A. Shannon, totaling 14 officers and 319 men, began a night march under Major Robert L. Howze. Arriving at Cusihuirischic, Howze found that 140 Villistas under Julio Acosta had pulled back into the mountains to the west to a ranch at Ojos Azules, and that the garrison commander had received orders not to cooperate with the Americans. Howze was delayed three hours in finding a guide and by the time he located the ranch and was deploying to attack, day had broken. When Acosta's guards and Howze's advance guard exchanged fire, Howze with Troop A immediately ordered a charge with pistols through the hacienda. Unable to deploy on line, the charge was made in column of fours and closed with the fleeing elements of Villistas. The other troops deployed to either side of the hacienda attempting to block escape and were supported by plunging fire from the machine gun troop. Friedrich Katz called the action the "greatest victory that the Punitive Expedition would achieve." Without a single casualty, the Americans killed forty-four Villistas and wounded many more. The survivors, including Acosta, were dispersed.

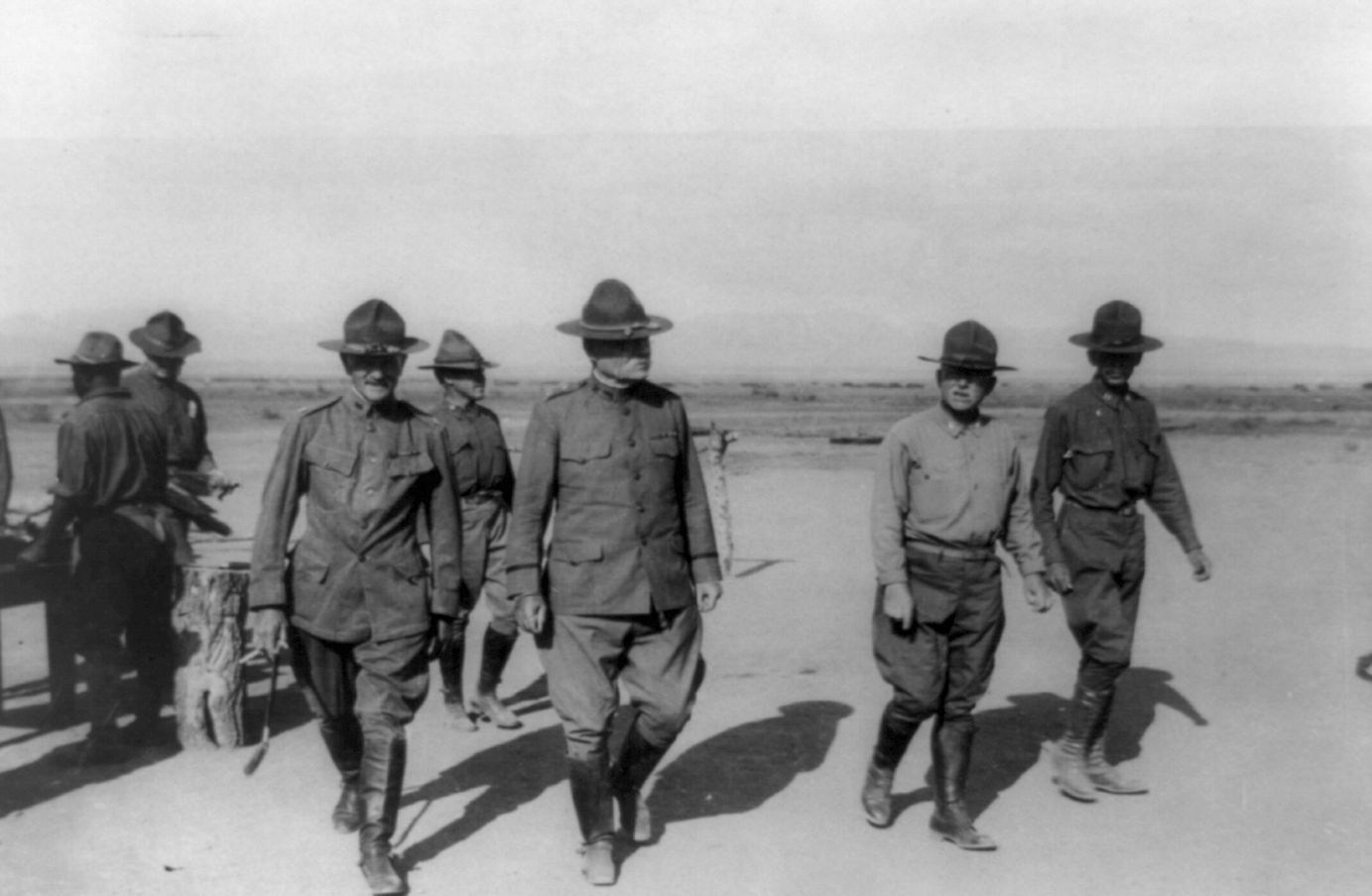
US Army Punitive Expedition after Villa, Mexico: General Pershing and General Bliss inspecting the camp, with Colonel Winn, Commander of the 24th Infantry

==== Raid on Glenn Springs ====
Also on May 5, several hundred Mexican raiders, under a Villista officer, attacked the geographically isolated towns of Glenn Springs and Boquillas in the Big Bend region of Texas. At Glenn Springs the Mexicans overwhelmed a squad of just nine 14th Cavalry troopers guarding the town, set fire to it, then rode on to Boquillas where they killed a boy, looted the town and took two captives. Local commanders pursued the Mexicans 100 miles into the state of Coahuila to free the captives and regain the stolen property. On May 12, Major George Tayloe Langhorne and two troops of the 8th Cavalry from Fort Bliss, Texas, reinforced by Colonel Frederick Sibley and Troops H and K of the 14th Cavalry from Fort Clark, rescued the captives at El Pino without a fight. Three days later a small detachment of cavalry encountered the raiders at Castillon, killing five of the Villistas and wounding two; the Americans had no casualties. The cavalry force returned to the United States May 21 after ten days in Mexico.

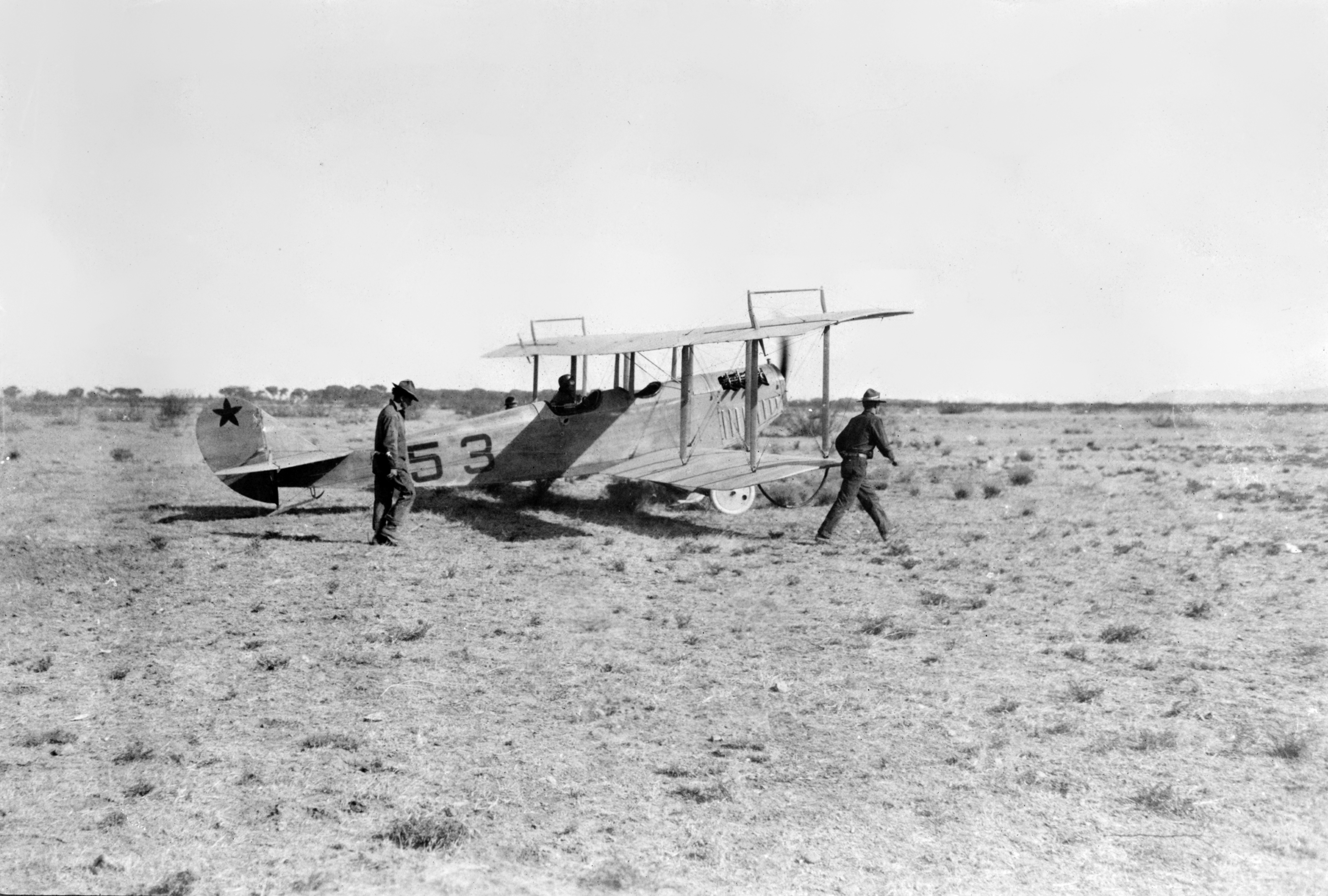
S.C. No. 53, a JN3 of the 1st Aero Squadron, at Casas Grandes, Mexico

On May 14, 2nd Lt. George S. Patton raided the San Miguelito Ranch, near Rubio, Chihuahua. Patton, a Pershing aide and a future World War II general, was out looking to buy some corn from the Mexicans when he came across the ranch of Julio Cárdenas, an important leader in the Villista military organization. With fifteen men and three Dodge touring cars, Patton led America's first motorised military action, in which Cárdenas and two other men were shot dead. The young lieutenant then had the three Mexicans strapped to the hood of the cars and driven back to General Pershing's headquarters. Patton is said to have carved three notches into the twin Colt Peacemakers he carried, representing the men he killed that day. General Pershing nicknamed him the "Bandito".

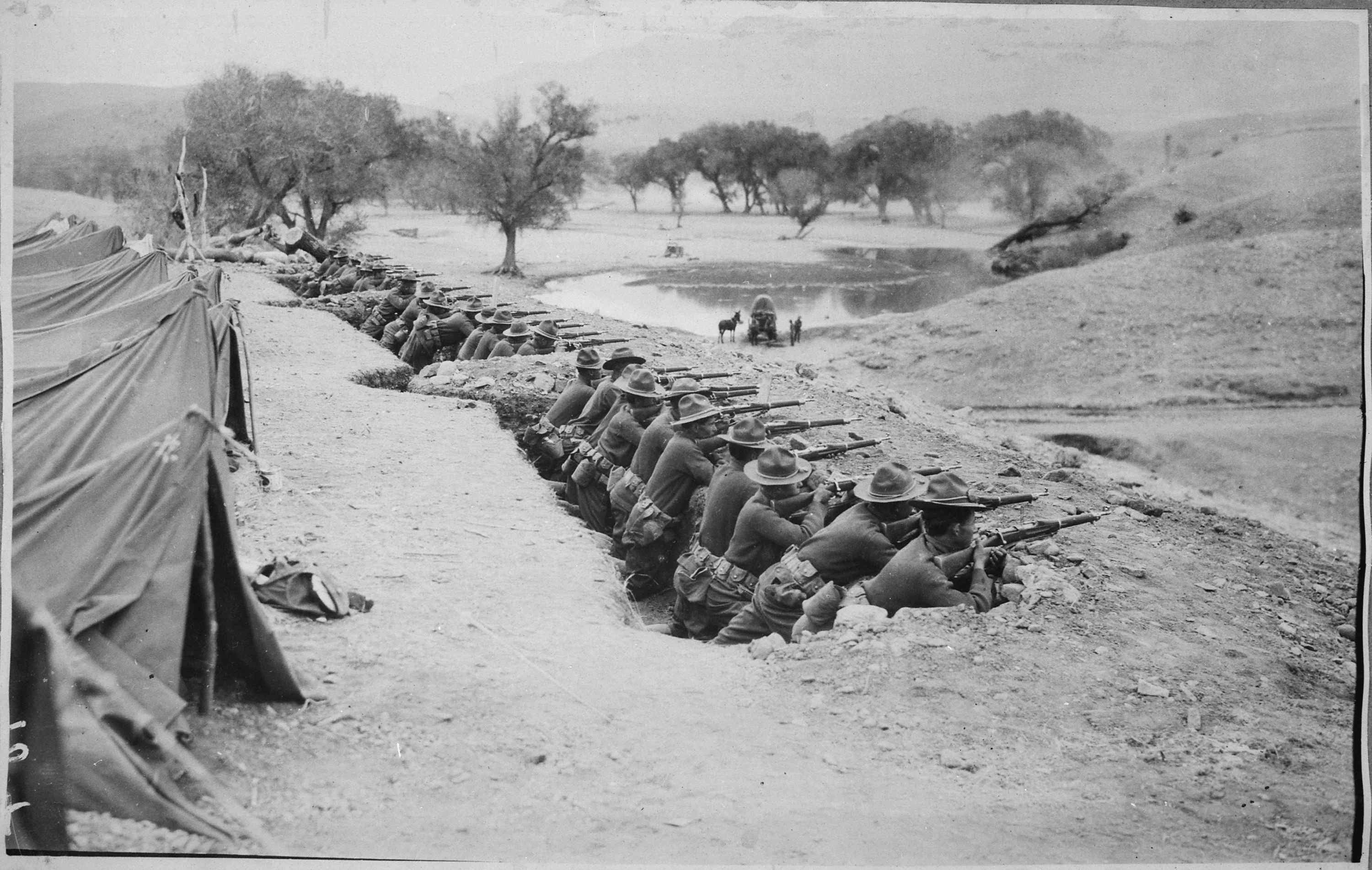
Soldiers of Company A of the 6th Infantry Regiment of the US Army stationed in a trench in Las Cruces on 10 April 1916

The Villistas launched an attack of their own on May 25. This time a small force of ten men from the 7th Cavalry were out looking for stray cattle and correcting maps when they were ambushed by twenty rebels just south of Cruces. One American corporal was killed and two other men were wounded, though they killed two of the "bandit leaders" and drove off the rest.

On June 2, Shannon and twenty Apache scouts fought a small skirmish with some of Candelaro Cervantes' men who had stolen a few horses from the 5th Cavalry. Shannon and the Apaches found the rebels' trail, which was a week old by then, and followed it for some time until finally catching up with the Mexicans near Las Varas Pass, about forty miles south of Namiquipa. Using the cover of darkness, Shannon and his scouts attacked the Villistas' hideout, killing one of them and wounding another without losses to themselves. The Villista who died was thought to be the leader as he carried a sword during the fight. (Note: Shannon, a 1903 graduate of West Point, rose in rank to lieutenant colonel during World War I, assigned to the staff of General Pershing. In October 1918 he volunteered for combat duty during the fighting in the Argonne and was assigned command of an infantry regiment. Shannon was killed in action on October 8 at Chatel-Chéhéry.)

Another skirmish was fought on June 9, north of Pershing's headquarters and the city of Chihuahua. Twenty men from the 13th Cavalry encountered an equally small force of Villistas and chased them through Santa Clara Canyon. Three of the Mexicans were killed, and the rest escaped. There were no American casualties.

=== End of active operations ===
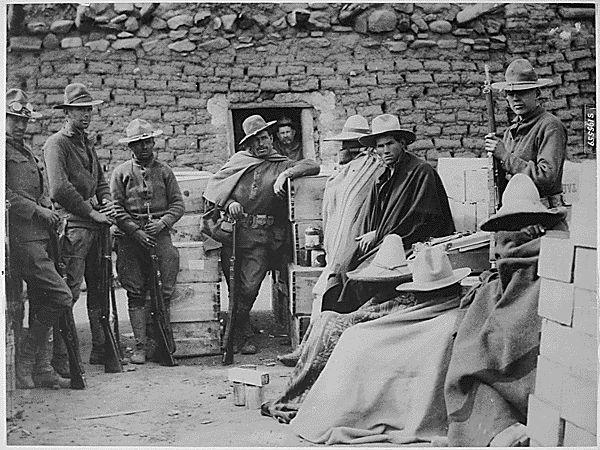
Villa bandits who raided Columbus, New Mexico, caught by American soldiers in the mountains of Mexico and held, in camp near Namiquipa, April 27, 1916. 1916–1917

On May 9, at a face-to-face meeting in El Paso, Texas, Carranza's Secretary of War and Navy, General Álvaro Obregón, threatened to send a massive force against the expedition's supply lines and forcibly drive it out of Mexico. Funston reacted by ordering Pershing to withdraw all his troops from San Antonio de Los Arenales to Colonia Dublán. Although the order was rescinded on the evening of May 11 when no evidence of Carrancista troop movements was found, the southernmost supply depots had been closed and materiel sent north that could not easily be turned around. Pershing was ordered to halt in place at Namiquipa, making tactical dispositions of his forces there and on El Valle to the north. The movements began a gradual withdrawal of the expedition to Dublán. On May 19, units of the 10th and 11th Cavalry returned to the base to guard the supply lines with Columbus and conduct reconnaissance in the absence of the temporarily grounded 1st Aero Squadron. As the threat of war with the de facto government increased, the northward movement continued. Pershing's headquarters left Namiquipa on June 21, setting up again in Dublán, after which the advanced supply depot at Namiquipa closed June 23. June 29 found the expedition concentrated on the main base and a forward camp at El Valle 60 miles to the south. (Note: Division headquarters was at Dublán while the three brigade headquarters were at El Valle. The regimental dispositions were: at El Valle, the 5th Cavalry, 6th and 16th Infantry, and the bulk of the artillery; at Dublán the 7th, 11th, and two squadrons of the 10th Cavalry, the 24th Infantry and two batteries of artillery; at Angostura between the camps, the 13th Cavalry; and at Ojo Frederico along the supply line back to Columbus, the 3rd Squadron 10th Cavalry. The 17th Infantry was distributed along the supply line, with a battalion in Columbus and another in Ojo Frederico.)

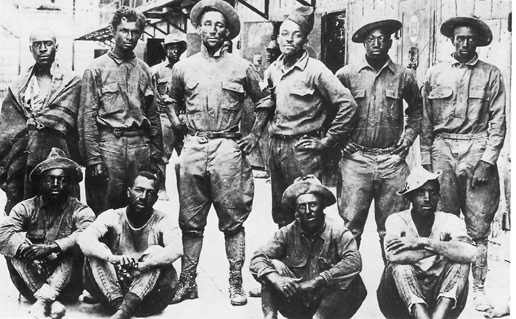
Buffalo Soldiers of the American 10th Cavalry Regiment who were taken prisoner during the Battle of Carrizal, Mexico in 1916

The last and most costly engagement of the Mexican Expedition was fought on June 21 when 3 officers and 87 men of Troops C and K of the 10th Cavalry, sent separately to scout Carrancista dispositions reported along the Mexican Central Railway, combined into a single column and encountered a blocking force of 300 soldiers. They were soundly defeated at the Battle of Carrizal, with Captain Charles T. Boyd, 1st Lt. Henry R. Adair, and ten enlisted men killed, (Note: Pershing's report states there were nine US dead. However it also lists three enlisted men missing in action, who are not included in accounts based on the report. The missing were later found to have been killed in action, bringing the total dead to 12.) ten wounded and another 24 (23 soldiers and 1 civilian guide) taken prisoner. The remainder, including the sole surviving officer, Capt. Lewis S. Morey, were rescued four days later by a relief squadron of the 11th Cavalry. The Mexicans did not do much better; they reported the loss of 24 men killed and 43 wounded, including their commander, General Félix Uresti Gómez, while Pershing listed 42 Carrancistas killed and 51 wounded. When General Pershing learned of the battle he was furious and asked for permission to attack the Carrancista garrison in the city of Chihuahua. President Wilson refused, knowing that it would certainly start a war.

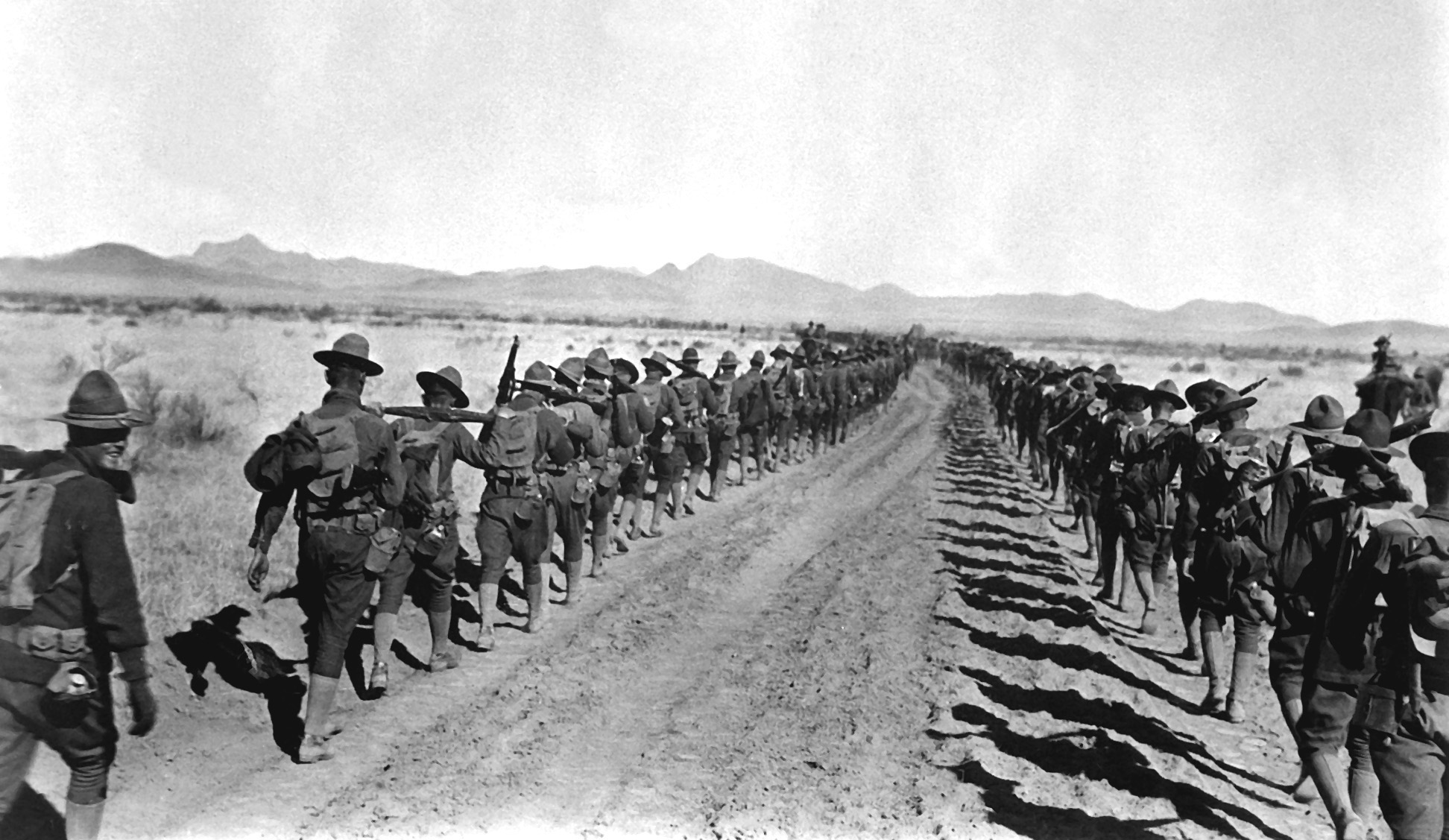
Column of 6th and 16th Infantry, on route to the States, between Corralitos Rancho

The action at Parral in April had made the destruction of Villa and his troops secondary to the objective of preventing further attacks on US forces by Carrancistas. The battle at Carrizal brought the countries to the brink of war and forced both governments to make immediate overt gestures clearly showing their intent to avoid it. Although the United States deployed 100,000 troops on the border, by July 4 the major crisis had passed. The Punitive Expedition, US Army remained at Colonia Dublán indefinitely as a fixed-base operation to be a negative incentive to the Carranza government to take seriously its obligation to catch Villa. The Carranza government proved unequal to the task but nevertheless US operations inside Mexico virtually ceased over the next six months.

A Joint High Commission for negotiations with the Carranza government was agreed upon in July, and the first of 52 sessions met on September 6 in New London, Connecticut. Although the commission reached accord on all issues, the negotiations failed to result in a formal agreement for withdrawal of US forces signed by the Mexican government. Despite this, Pershing was ordered on January 18, 1917, to prepare the expedition for return to the United States, which was executed between January 28 and February 5. While the expedition made a dozen successful contacts with Villista groups in the first two months of the campaign, killing many of his important subordinates and 169 of his men, all of whom had participated in the attack on Columbus, it failed in its other major objective of capturing Villa. However, between the date of the American withdrawal and Villa's retirement in 1920, Villa's troops did not again successfully raid the United States.

== National Guard call-ups ==
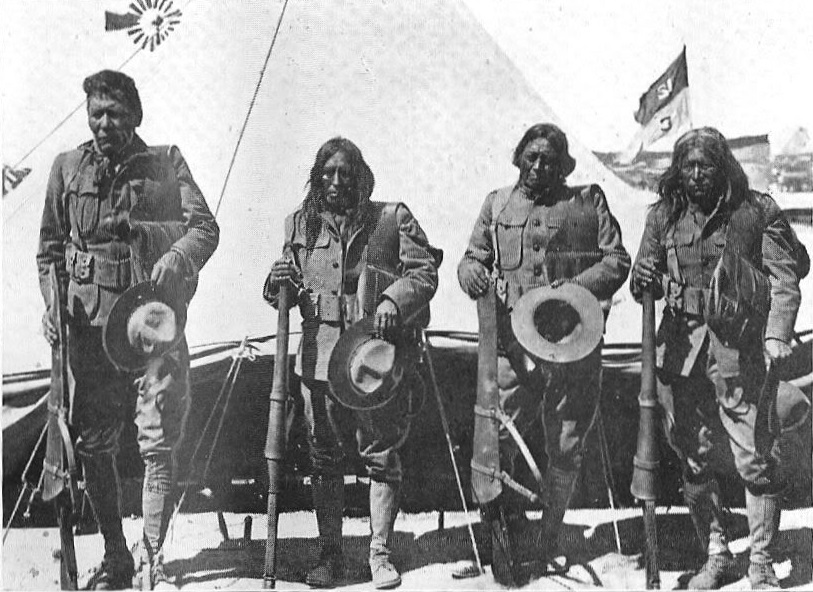
Apache Scouts called up to help hunt for the trail of Villa 1916

Between June 1915 and June 1916 Mexican irregulars carried out 38 raids on United States territory, resulting in the deaths of 26 soldiers and 11 civilians. Following the attack on Glenn Springs, the Army transferred three regiments of active duty soldiers (Note: The 14th Infantry, 21st Infantry, and 6th Field Artillery.) to the border area. On May 8, state militia units from Texas, Arizona, and New Mexico were activated. On June 15, 1916, another attempted raid by Mexican border-crossers, this at San Ygnacio, Texas, 30 miles downstream from Laredo, was repulsed by US soldiers with casualties to both sides. As a result, using powers granted by passage of the National Defense Act of 1916, Wilson on June 18 fully mobilized Guard units from the remainder of the states and the District of Columbia for duty on the border. More than 140,000 National Guard troops were called up, but only two regiments, the 1st New Mexico Infantry and the 2nd Massachusetts Infantry, were actually assigned to the Mexican Expedition, and those to guard the base at Columbus. Historian Clarence C. Clendenen asserts that although no Guard units officially crossed into Mexico at any time, soldiers from the two regiments at Columbus did enter Mexico to perform various tasks.

Wide differences in proficiency existed between various Guard units in training, leadership and equipment, but for the most part, units came to the border with only basic drilling as experience. Units were initially assigned as static guards for railroad bridges and border crossing points, but as training made them more proficient, they were assigned increasing responsibilities for patrolling the border that resulted in encounters with smugglers and bandits who still posed an occasional threat. For example, records of the Utah National Guard indicate that it participated in three skirmishes after it arrived at Camp Stephen J. Little on the Arizona border in July 1916. The final action of the three, occurring January 26, 1917, resulted in an all-day border skirmish between Utah cavalrymen and Mexicans in which the Guardsmen were reinforced and ten Mexicans were killed or wounded. (Note: The exact details of this "battle" are in dispute. Roberts, citing Utah National Guard records, refers to it as "The Battle of Casa Piedra" (stone house), so-called for prominent ruins five miles south of Ruby, Arizona on the border with Mexico. In his account the Mexicans are cattle rustlers who opened fire on the Utah guardsmen when discovered. However according to the Arizona Daily Star of January 27, 1917, the Mexicans were Carrancista cavalrymen on the Mexican side of the border who fired at six American cowboys on the United States side who were trying to keep cattle from straying across the line. 14 guardsmen responded from their camp at Arivaca, Arizona, and were later reinforced by 18 more, in what the Daily Star called "The Battle of Ruby." The only agreement between the accounts is that it involved Troop E, 2nd Squadron Utah Cavalry, and there were no American casualties.) While incapable of conducting organized combat operations with other units, the border security mission proved a training environment for the officers and men of the National Guard, who were again inducted into federal service after the United States entered World War I in April 1917. Many National Guard leaders in both world wars traced their first federal service to the Mexican Expedition. In their history of the call-up, Charles Harris and Louis Sadler reveal its significance:

Between June 1916 and April 1917 the guard received intensive field training. Units from different states were sometimes grouped into large provisional units. Not only did the men become more proficient, but many officers gained invaluable experience commanding large formations. At the same time the guard was receiving badly needed equipment and supplies. The great call-up transformed the national guard into a much more effective fighting force, for it was as close as the United States came to the large-scale military maneuvers in which European armies traditionally engaged.

== Aftermath ==
After US forces were withdrawn in January 1917, Pershing publicly claimed the expedition to be a success, which in light of the public declarations by President Wilson was clearly not the case since Villa eluded capture by the US Army. Pershing complained privately to his family that Wilson had imposed too many restrictions, which made it impossible for him to fulfill that portion of his mission. In the sting of the moment, having been compelled to withdraw out of political considerations and before much larger events in Europe put the episode behind him, he wrote that "Having dashed into Mexico with the intention of eating the Mexicans raw, we turned back at the first repulse and are now sneaking home under cover, like a whipped curr with its tail between its legs", referring to the massive rules of political restrictions put on him by President Wilson. Villa, however, gloated about Pershing's failure of capturing him with his characteristic harshness "That Pershing, came in like an eagle, and leaves now like a wet chicken". During the three months of active operations, American forces killed or captured 292 Villistas and captured 605 rifles, 5 pistols, 14 machine guns, and 139 horses and mules from the Villistas. Most of the horses and mules were returned to local residents and the pistols kept as souvenirs.

Pershing was permitted to bring into New Mexico 527 Chinese refugees who had assisted him during the expedition, despite the ban on Chinese immigration at that time under the Chinese Exclusion Act. The Chinese refugees, known as "Pershing's Chinese", were allowed to remain in the US if they worked under the supervision of the military as cooks and servants on bases. In 1921, Congress passed Public Resolution 29, which allowed them to remain in the country permanently under the conditions of the 1892 Geary Act. Most of them settled in San Antonio, Texas. A number of Mexicans who had supported the US forces as well as American Mormons who had resided in Mexico also returned with Pershing. In 2009 a historical marker giving more details about these refugees was erected at Fort Sam Houston.

Soldiers who took part in the Villa campaign were awarded the Mexican Service Medal.

== Legacy ==
The chase after Villa was a small military episode, but it had important long-term implications by enabling Carranza to mobilize popular anger, strengthening his political position, and permanently escalating anti-American sentiment in Mexico. On the American side, it made Pershing a national figure and, after Funston died of a heart attack shortly after the expedition returned to the United States, an obvious choice to lead the American forces in France in 1917. It gave the inexperienced American Army some needed experience in dealing with training, logistics, and command using national guardsmen in a foreign land. It gave the American public a way to work out its frustrations over the European stalemate, showed that the United States was willing to defend its borders, and kept that demonstration on a small scale.

== Order of battle ==
United States Army:

- 5th Cavalry Regiment
- 7th Cavalry Regiment
- 10th Cavalry Regiment (Buffalo Soldiers)
- 11th Cavalry Regiment
- 13th Cavalry Regiment
- 6th Infantry Regiment
- 16th Infantry Regiment
- 17th Infantry Regiment
- 24th Infantry Regiment (Buffalo Soldiers)
- 4th Field Artillery Regiment
- 6th Field Artillery Regiment
- 1st Aero Squadron
- Apache Scouts
- 2nd Massachusetts Infantry
- 1st Battalion, Field Artillery, Michigan National Guard

== See also ==
- Bandit War
- Cananea strike
- Garza Revolution
- Las Cuevas War
- List of United States invasions of Latin American countries
