= Genovevo =

Genovevo is a masculine given name of Spanish-language origin. It may refer to:

- Genovevo de la O (1876–1952), general in the Mexican Revolution
- Genovevo Morejón (born 1954), Cuban hammer thrower
- Genovevo Rivas Guillén (1886–1947), Mexican general and provisional governor
