= Battle of Carrizal =

1916 battle in the Mexican state of Chihuahua

- Part of the Mexican Border War
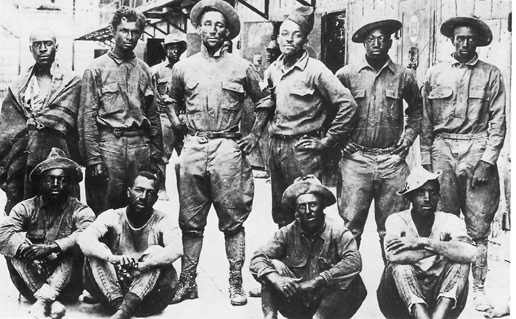
- Captured U.S. soldiers after the battle
Date	June 21, 1916
Location	Carrizal, Chihuahua, Mexico
Result	Mexican victory

Belligerents
Carrancistas	United States

Commanders and leaders
Félix Gómez †; Genovevo Rivas	Charles T. Boyd †; Henry R. Adair †

Strength
150	200

Casualties and losses
27 killed 39 wounded	12 killed 28 wounded 24 captured

The Battle of Carrizal occurred on June 21, 1916. It was a major skirmish between United States Army troops of General John J. Pershing's Punitive Expedition and Carrancista troops fought at the town of Carrizal in the Mexican state of Chihuahua.

== Battle ==
In June 1916, Gen. Pershing was informed that Pancho Villa could be taken at Carrizal, west of Ahumada. When he sent Captains Boyd and Morey to investigate with C and K troops of the 10th Cavalry, they were confronted by Mexican Army troops, not Villa's men. The Mexican army was ordered by Venustiano Carranza to fire upon any American soldier moving in any direction but north. The Americans were issued a warning by the Mexican army. Boyd ordered the men to attack anyway. In the resulting battle, the American attack was repelled.

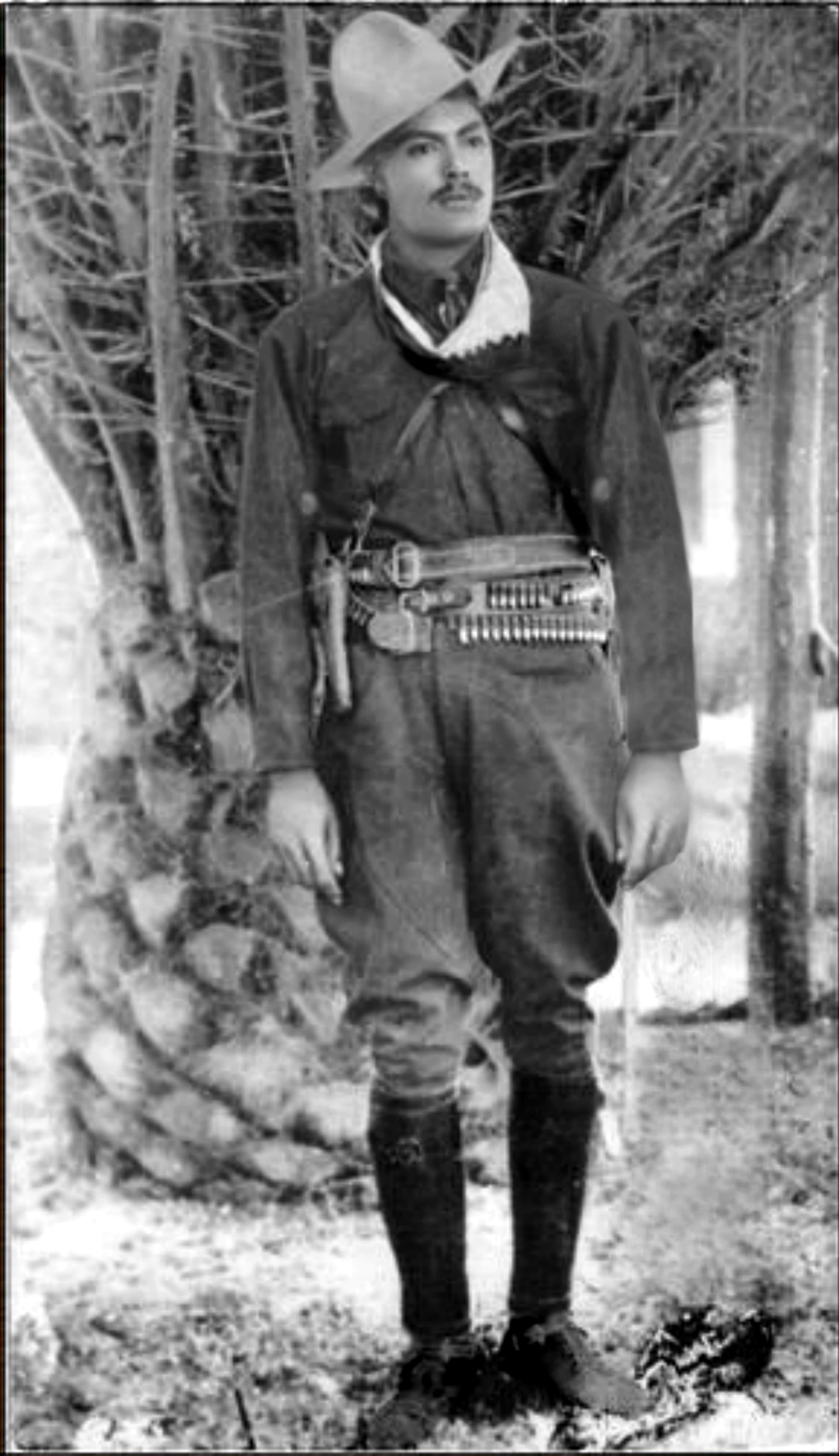
General Felix U. Gómez

By legend, Villa supposedly watched with delight as his two enemies fought it out with each other. However, this story is of doubtful veracity as Villa was badly injured at the time and being pursued by both the American Army and the federal Carrancistas. The cavalry's two officers (Charles T. Boyd and Henry R. Adair) and 10 other men were killed and 24 taken prisoner. The Mexican forces lost from 20 to 50 soldiers, including the commanding officer, Gen. Félix Uresti Gómez. General Pershing was furious at this result and asked for permission to attack the Carrancista garrison at Chihuahua. President Wilson, fearing that such an attack would provoke a full-scale war with Mexico, refused. The Battle of Carrizal marked the effective end of the Mexican Expedition. Pancho Villa survived, and small raids on American soil occurred while the expedition was in Mexico. The simultaneous deterioration of German-American relations while World War I raged made any escalation in Mexico undesirable and so negotiations followed.

== Mexican Perspective ==
Mexican reaction to Carrizal reflected a broader resentment of the Punitive Expedition. According to Mexican accounts, the idea of a war with the United States led members of the populace to enlist for military instruction, and Mexicans residing within the United States presented themselves to their local consulates to return to Mexico and help defend their country. Additionally, the crisis appeared to be narrowing the divide between the supporters of Carranza and of Villa, as more than one hundred wealthy Mexicans who had previously supported Villa and fled to El Paso, crossed back into Mexico and were received favorably by Carranza's authorities. Additionally, during the time of the incursion, the Mexican government appealed abroad, telegraphing eighteen Latin American governments to accuse the United States of perfidy. During the battle itself, when General Felix U. Gómez was killed, he became a hero. Press accounts reported that Chihuahua officials and civilians escorted his body to the railway station, and that as many as 5,000 people paid respects in Saltillo before his burial.

== Legacy ==
- Lt. Henry Rodney Adair was killed in this battle. During World War II Camp Adair was established in the Willamette Valley, Oregon, as an Army training facility in honor of his service.
- The Battle of Carrizal figured prominently in the plot of the 1917 race movie, A Trooper of Troop K
- In Mexico, The Battle of Carrizal is commemorated as a defense of national sovereignty, and General Felix U. Gomez is remembered as the "Hero of El Carrizal".
- On the battle's 100 year anniversary, The Coahuila states executive, judicial, and legislative branches held a session to honor his service, and had his name inscribed on the Muro de Honor (Wall of Honor) of its legislative chamber.

== See also ==
- United States involvement in the Mexican Revolution
- Mexico in World War I
