= Raid on San Ygnacio =

Battle between the United States Army and Mexican raiders in June 1916

- Part of the Bandit War, Mexican Revolution
- Location: San Ygnacio, Texas
- Date: June 15, 1916
- Deaths: ≈12
- Injuries: ≈5

The Raid on San Ygnacio refers to a skirmish on June 15, 1916 between the United States Army and Mexican raiders near the border town of San Ygnacio, Texas. Three different Mexican factions were known to have launched raids into Texas at the time but most of the evidence suggests that either Sediciosos or Carrancistas were responsible for the incursion. Four American soldiers and at least six of the raiders were killed during the battle and the resulting American punitive expedition further strained the already hostile relationship between the Mexican and United States governments.

== Background ==
The Mexican Revolution created widespread unrest in the border areas of the United States and Mexico. By early 1915, a group of Mexican rebels, calling themselves Sediciosos, drafted the Plan of San Diego with the intention of bringing the American border states under the control of President Venustiano Carranza. They then began attacking military outposts, small towns, and ranches in South Texas. The Sediciosos were originally led by Luis de la Rosa but, in June 1916, he was arrested by Carrancista authorities, while traveling to Monterey, and put under house arrest. This, combined with the previous capture of other Sedicioso leaders, effectively ended the campaign by early 1916. However the superintendent of the Mexican National Railway, Esteban Fierros, was suspected of organizing raids during the summer of 1916 in accordance with the plan and even planned to invade the United States on June 10, the day American soldiers pursued a band of raiders to Matamoros and just five days before San Ygnacio was attacked. The Mexican Army, also known as Constitutionalistas or Carrancistas, which had already shown hostility towards the United States on several occasions and threatened to kill American soldiers.

Supporters of Pancho Villa also raided along the Texas border, but the facts that most of what they controlled at the time was in Chihuahua, northwest of San Ygnacio, and that General John J. Pershing was dispersing Villa's forces at that time as part of the Mexican Expedition make it unlikely that the Villistas were responsible.

On April 12, 1916, the Carrancistas backed up their threats and attacked the 13th Cavalry at Parral. On June 21, after the San Ygnacio Raid, they attacked the 10th Cavalry in the Battle of Carrizal.

== Raid ==
San Ygnacio was just another small South Texas border town, situated about thirty miles south of Laredo and 180 miles west of Brownsville on the banks of the Rio Grande. In 1908 the hamlet of only 198 residents had several general stores, a post office, a drugstore and other associated buildings. Because of the unrest in that area, Troop I and Troop M, 14th Cavalry, were stationed at a camp just outside it. Altogether the American force numbered about 150 men when over 100 Mexicans attacked the cavalry camp at about 2:00 am, on June 15. An American sentry heard noises from some underbrush near the camp and when the patrol was sent to investigate the sound was fired upon. Hastily the Americans assembled in a series of trenches and repulsed the attack. Official United States Army records state that three enlisted men were killed and about six more were wounded, one of them fatally. The Mexicans lost in between six and eight men killed, according to differing accounts, and several captured. American reports said they recovered the bodies of six Mexicans and that several others may have been wounded before they escaped back to Mexico. One of the Mexicans killed at San Ygnacio was identified by the United States Army as Lieutenant Colonel Villareal, of the Constitutional Army. The Americans first assumed that Villareal was either a Sedicioso or a Villista but a captured raider said that he was "not a member of any plan [of San Diego] nor a Villista, but a Carrancista [Constitutionalist] soldier who was just obeying orders." This may not have been true though, according to Stout, because General Alfredo Ricaut, of the Constitutional Army, was campaigning against raiders during the time of the attack.

== Aftermath ==
Major Alonzo Gray was in command of the American forces during the battle and immediately after it he was authorized to command a punitive expedition to pursue the raiders. Major Gray crossed the border into Tamaulipas, on June 16, but he was unsuccessful in finding the Mexicans' trail. Meanwhile, about thirty raiders fired on some men of the 26th Infantry near San Benito, Texas. General James Parker responded by sending Colonel Robert Bullard and 400 soldiers into Mexico on the same day. Bullard's men engaged the raiders in a "stiff skirmish" near the border but it ended "apparently without casualties." The Americans could not pursue any further because General Ricaut, under orders from Carranza, assembled 1,000 soldiers in Matamoros and threatened to attack them unless they returned to the United States. Ricault also vowed to catch the raiders himself, armed the civilian population of Matamoros and "ripped up" the railroad tracks leading across the Rio Grande. Ricaut's men would eventually capture forty of the raiders and later that day, after the bloodless skirmish, they attacked Major Edward Anderson, 3rd Cavalry, and his squadron of men as they were heading back to Texas. During the firefight that followed, two of the Mexicans were killed without loss on the Americans' side.

Both the San Ignacio and San Benito raids, along with General Pershing expedition in Chihuahua, created a situation in the United States and Mexico that seemed to be a "repetition of that process that brought Europe into war in 1914." Just two days after the raids, on June 18, President Woodrow Wilson announced that he was sending the remaining National Guard regiments to the border, not including the Arizona, New Mexico and Texas regiments which had already been in position since May. Within two weeks, American reinforcements began to arrive and by the end of the year over 150,000 militiamen were in position. Wilson also sent sixteen additional warships to patrol the Gulf of Mexico and Mexico's Pacific coast. Carranza followed suit by concentrating his forces along the border and issuing a "general call to the civilians of Mexico to arm themselves" in preparation for an American invasion. According to the New outlook, Volume 113; "there were spectacles in the cities of the United States not since 1898" during the Spanish–American War. In addition, thousands of Americans living in Mexico began fleeing north, or to the safety of the United States Navy. War would never come though, other than a raid near Fort Hancock, Texas on June 31, incursions into American territory ceased by July, which helped resolve some of the tension between the two nations. It wasn't until late 1917 that a new series of attacks would begin. But, like the engagement near Fort Hancock, they all occurred in West Texas, far away from where the Sediciosos were active.

Another factor that prevented an escalation of the conflict was that neither Wilson or Carranza wanted war. Wilson was focused on events in Europe and Carranza said he was "absolutely certain that the American people do not want war with Mexico ... but there are nevertheless strong American interests and strong Mexican interests determine to procure a conflict between the counties. ... the Mexican government firmly desires to maintain peace with the American Government, but in order to [reach this goal] it is [imperative] that the American Government explain frankly its true intention towards Mexico." Alleging that Wilson was interested in more than just stopping the raids. Wilson responded to Carranza by voicing his concerns, saying; "for three years the Mexican Republic has been torn with Civil strife; the lives of Americans and other aliens have been sacrificed; vast properties developed by American capital and enterprise have been destroyed or rendered nonproductive; bandits [raiders] have been permitted to roam through the territory contiguous to the United States and to seize, without punishment or effective attempt at punishment, the property of Americans."
