= Charles T. Boyd =

American captain (1870–1916)

Charles Trumbull Boyd
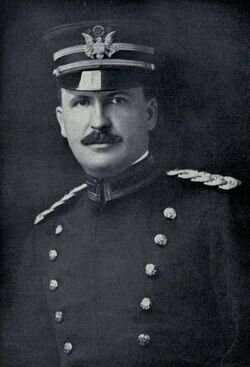
- Born: October 29, 1870; Sperry, Iowa, United States
- Died: June 21, 1916 (aged 45); Carrizal, Chihuahua, Mexico
- Burial place: Arlington National Cemetery, Virginia, United States
- Military career
- Allegiance: United States
- Branch: United States Army
- Service years: 1896—1916
- Rank: Captain
- Commands: 10th Cavalry Regiment
- Conflicts: Spanish–American War; Philippine–American War: Battle of Manila; Capture of Malolos; Battle of San Isidro; Mexican Revolution: Battle of Carrizal †

Charles Trumbull Boyd (October 29, 1870 – June 21, 1916) was an American captain who was most notable for his service and death in the Battle of Carrizal in the Mexican Revolution.

== Biography ==
Boyd was born in Sperry on October 29, 1870. He would study in the United States Military Academy as a cadet from June 15, 1892, to June 12, 1896, where he graduated to Second Lieutenant of the 7th Cavalry Regiment and stationed at Fort Grant, Arizona. On March 24, 1897, Boyd was transferred to the Presidio of San Francisco with the 4th Cavalry Regiment.

=== Campaign in the Philippines ===
When the Spanish–American War and the Philippine–American War broke out, Boyd participated in the battles in and about Manila on Feb. and March, 1899; operations against Lateros and Pasig, March, 1899; operations against Malolos, March, 1899; operations against Balinag, San Miguel, and San Isidro, March and July, 1899; operations against Antipolo and Morong, June, 1899; operations against Paranaque and Las Pinas, June, 1899. For his service, he was promoted to major on July 5, 1899.

=== Regimental career ===
After his service, Boyd returned to the United States and served as a regimental commander for the 37th Volunteer Infantry from Sept. 18, 1899 to April 15, 1900. He then served as quartermaster for the horse transport Thyra from Sept. 15, 1900 to Nov. 3, 1900 and quartermaster of the Samoa from Jan. 10, 1901 to May 1, 1901, while being stationed at the Presidio of San Francisco before moving to Camp A. E. Wood in modern-day Yosemite National Park and the Jefferson Barracks Military Post from May 2, 1901, to Oct. 23, 1902. He then served as Professor of Military Science and Tactics in the University of Nevada from Nov. 3, 1902 to May 12, 1905. Boyd was promoted to captain on Jan. 16, 1903. He successfully passed the California bar examination on Sept. 24, 1903. Boyd traveled to Manchuria to undergo research on the Russo-Japanese War from July to October 1904.

=== Later service and death ===
Boyd was then transferred to Duluan and Cotabato and from Sept. 15, 1905 to Oct. 28, 1906, he served as Governor of Cotabato from Jan. 1, 1906 to Oct. 28, 1906 after he resigned at his own request and was then transferred to Fort D. A. Russell around Dec. 30 and 31, 1906, and Feb. 28, 1907 and then returned to the Philippines to accompany a regiment from March 1 to April 2, 1907, and then was stationed in Fort William McKinley from April 3, 1907, to April 14, 1909. He was then transferred in Fort Ethan Allen from May 14 to July 10, 1908, and would return to the fort from May 20, 1909, to Aug. 1, 1911. Boyd then became a member of Cavalry Rifle Team from June 4 to 29, 1910. He then went to Fort Leavenworth as a student officer at Army School of the Line, Aug. 4, 1911, to Aug. 15, 1912 when he entered the Staff Class while also becoming a Instructor at Camps of Instruction, Eastern Department, summer of 1912. Boyd was then relieved as student officer and participated in the Staff College until Dec. 15, 1912 where he returned to Fort Ethan Allen, as commanding Troop, Dec. 21, 1912, to Dec. 5, 1913; at Fort Huachuca, Arizona, and was then sent to the Mexican border, to Aug. 10, 1915 but then returned to Fort Leavenworth as a student officer at Army Staff College from Aug. 11, 1915, to May 22, 1916, when he was relieved and joined his regiment in the Pancho Villa Expedition into Mexico. Boyd would participate in the Battle of Carrizal against the Carrancistas on June 21, 1916, but would die from wounds and the battle would mark the end of the expedition. Boyd would later be buried in the Arlington National Cemetery on July 11, 1916.
