= Glenn Springs, Texas =

- Ghost Town
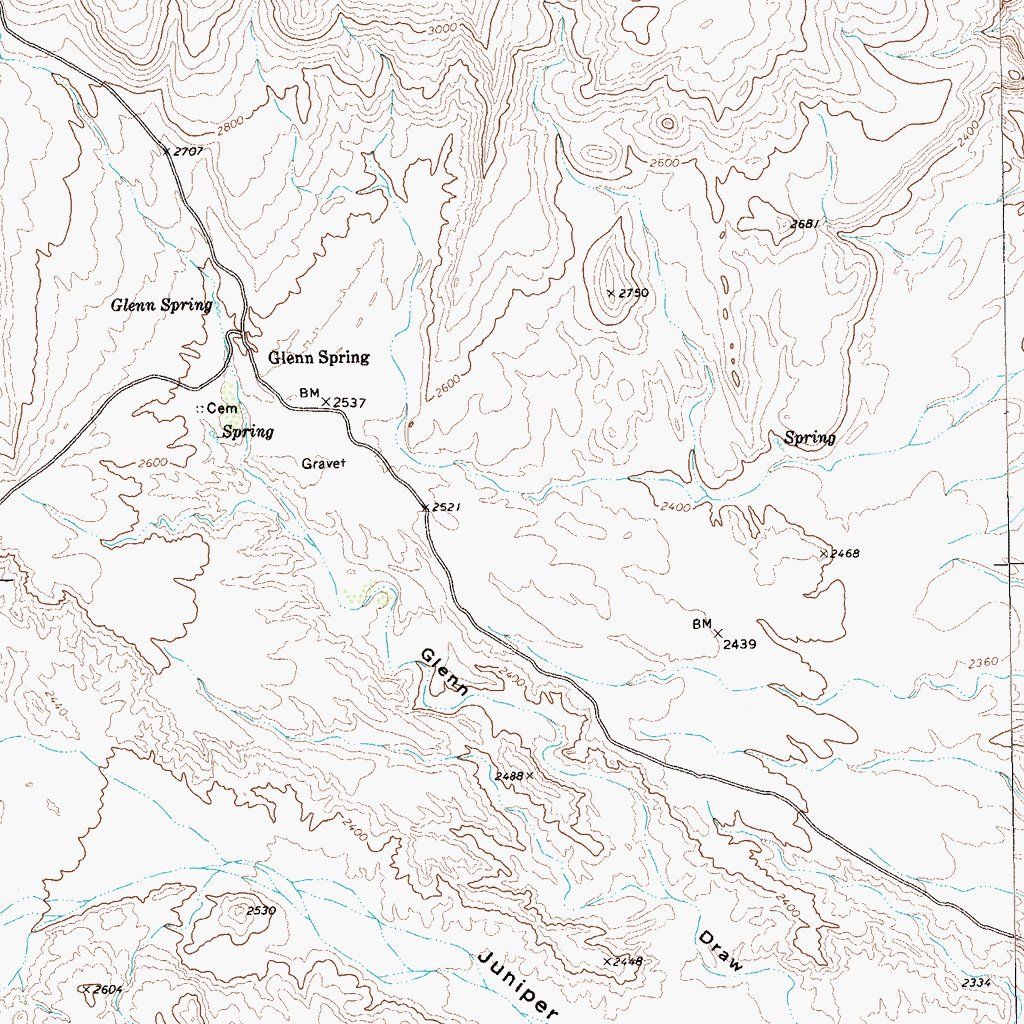
- Topo Map of Glenn Springs, Texas
- Nickname: Glenn Spring, Texas
- Location within Texas Glenn Springs, Texas (the United States)
- Coordinates: 29°09′40″N 103°08′51″W
- Country: United States
- State: Texas
- County: Brewster
- Elevation: 2,448 ft (746 m)
- Time zone: UTC-6 (Central (CST))
  - Summer (DST): UTC-5 (CDT)
- ZIP codes: 79834
- Area code: 432
- GNIS feature ID: 2034866

Glenn Springs is a ghost town in the state of Texas, United States, which is of historical importance. The Glenn Springs area was a natural spring providing water for Apache and Kiowa routing.

The rural settlement is located 11 miles (16 kilometers) south-southeast of the Panther Junction visitor center in what is now the Big Bend National Park, and is accessible only by high-clearance vehicle. The National Park Service maintains a back-country campground at Glenn Springs.

== Military occupation ==
Glenn Springs was a military encampment, which was attacked by the troops of the Mexican General Pancho Villa on 5 May 1916, killing one civilian, three U.S. Army soldiers, and wounding several other troops. The Glenn Springs Raid came 57 days after the famous attack on Columbus, New Mexico.

== Wax Camp ==
During the Spanish Texas era, candelilla was harvested in the Big Bend and Chisos Mountains region of the Trans-Pecos. The wax plant provided a malleable solid for candles used by the Spanish missions in Texas fulfilling the Franciscan and Jesuit orders.

In 1914, W.K. Ellis and C.D. Wood established a wax factory on the embankment of Glenn Springs employing a population in the mountainous Chihuahuan Desert region. By 1916, the candelillero factory consisted of a boiler room with tall smoke stacks, six large extraction vats, and a water storage system for the production of candelilla wax.
