= Félix Uresti Gómez =

General Félix Uresti Gómez
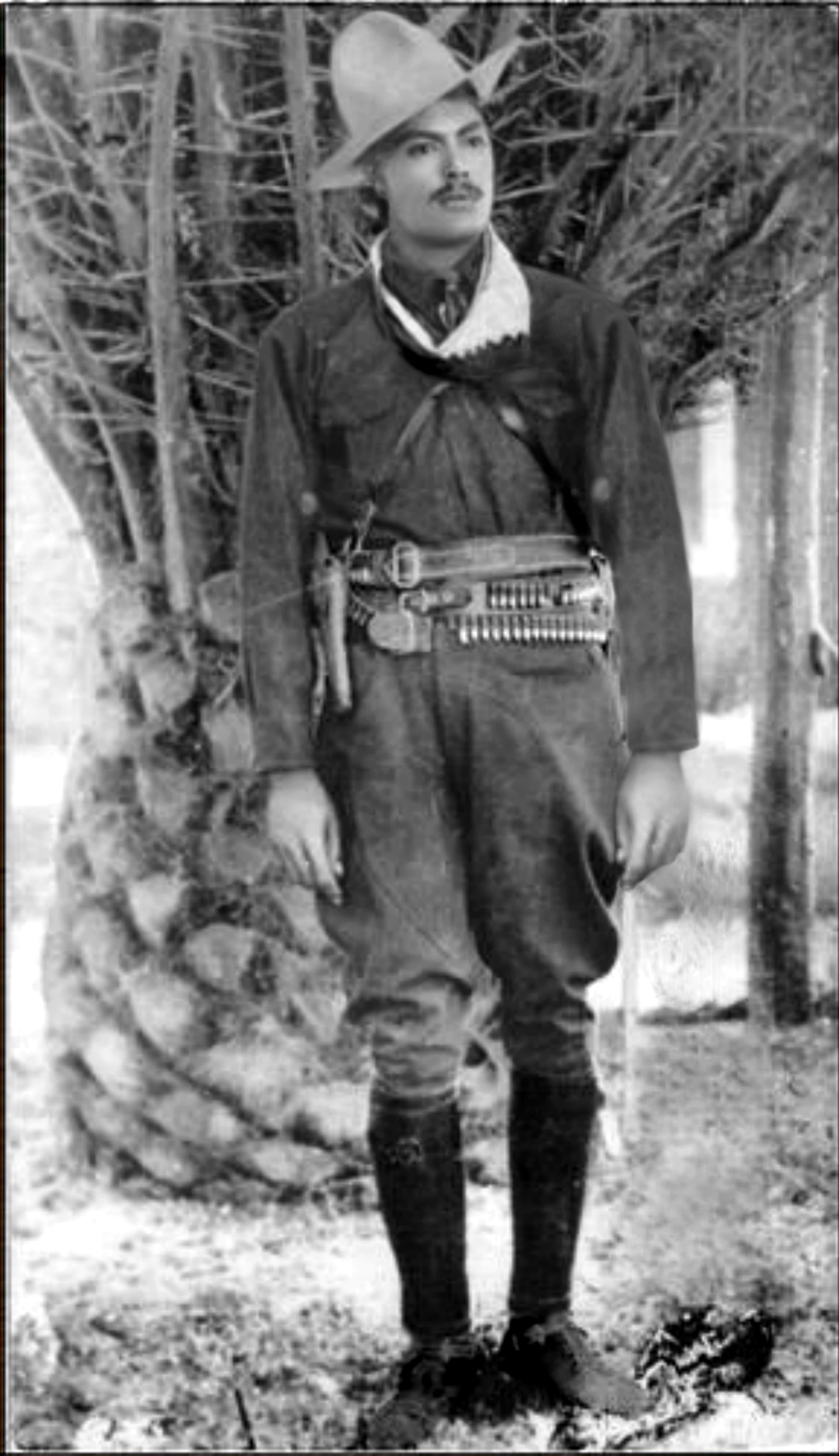
- Félix U. Gómez
- Born: Félix Uresti Gómez; 1 July 1887; Gómez Farias, Coahuila
- Died: 21 June 1916 (aged 28); Carrizal, Chihuahua, Mexico
- Military career
- Allegiance: (Mexico) Carrancistas
- Branch: (Mexico) Constitutional Army
- Service years: 1913–1916
- Rank: General
- Nickname: Hero of Carriza
- Commands: Constitutional Army
- Conflicts: Mexican Revolution: Battle of Carrizal †

Félix Uresti Gómez (July 1, 1887 – June 21, 1916) was a Mexican revolutionary holding the rank of General and leading Mexican forces at Carrizal, Chihuahua on June 21, 1916.

His life was spent between Gomez Farias, Coahuila, where he was born, had his house and now his grave, and San Salvador, Zacatecas, where his uncle Marcos Uresti and his grandfather Jeronimo Uresti lived. In this city he had his first school lessons, later he started to work in the mines. In 1913 he aligned with the forces of Venustiano Carranza and was commissioned a general officer. In October 1914 the revolutionary movement suffered additional internal divisions, but he remained faithful to the Carrancista faction.

On June 21, 1916, Gomez was leading a force of 400 Mexican soldiers tasked with repelling a US Army cavalry detachment composed of soldiers from Troops "C" and "K" of the 10th US Cavalry at the town of Carrizal, Chihuahua. His orders were to prevent the Americans from moving any direction but north—an action contrary to the cavalry detachment's orders. The Americans, buffalo soldiers under General John J. Pershing, had entered Mexican territory on the so-called Punitive Expedition in pursuit of Pancho Villa following his attack on Columbus, New Mexico. An attempt to peacefully pass through Carrizal in violation of Gomez's orders, resulted in a gun battle that saw the deaths of Gomez along with 79 other Mexican soldiers being killed or wounded. All the American officers present were killed and the surviving enlisted soldiers taken prisoner and held until they were repatriated several months later.

For his role in this battle, the Mexican government named Gomez the "Hero of Carrizal."
