= Ahumada Municipality =

Municipality in the Mexican state of Chihuahua

Ahumada
- Municipality
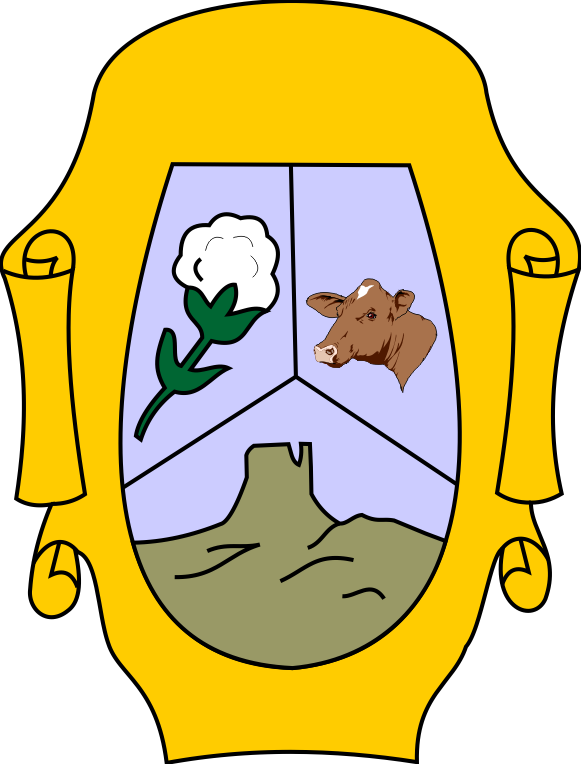
- Coat of arms

- Municipality of Ahumada in Chihuahua
- Coordinates: 30°37′N 106°31′W
- Country: Mexico
- State: Chihuahua
- Founded: 1894
- Named for: Miguel Ahumada
- Seat: Villa Ahumada
- Largest city: Villa Ahumada

Area
  - Total: 17,131.5 km^{2} (6,614.5 sq mi)

Population (2010)
  - Total: 11,457

Ahumada is one of the 67 municipalities of Chihuahua, in northern Mexico. The municipal seat lies at Villa Ahumada. The municipality covers an area of 17,131.5 km^{2}.

As of 2010, the municipality had a total population of 11,457, down from 11,727 as of 2005.

The municipality has 553 localities, the largest of which (with 2010 populations in parentheses) is Villa Ahumada (8,575), classified as urban.

== Geography ==
=== Towns and villages ===
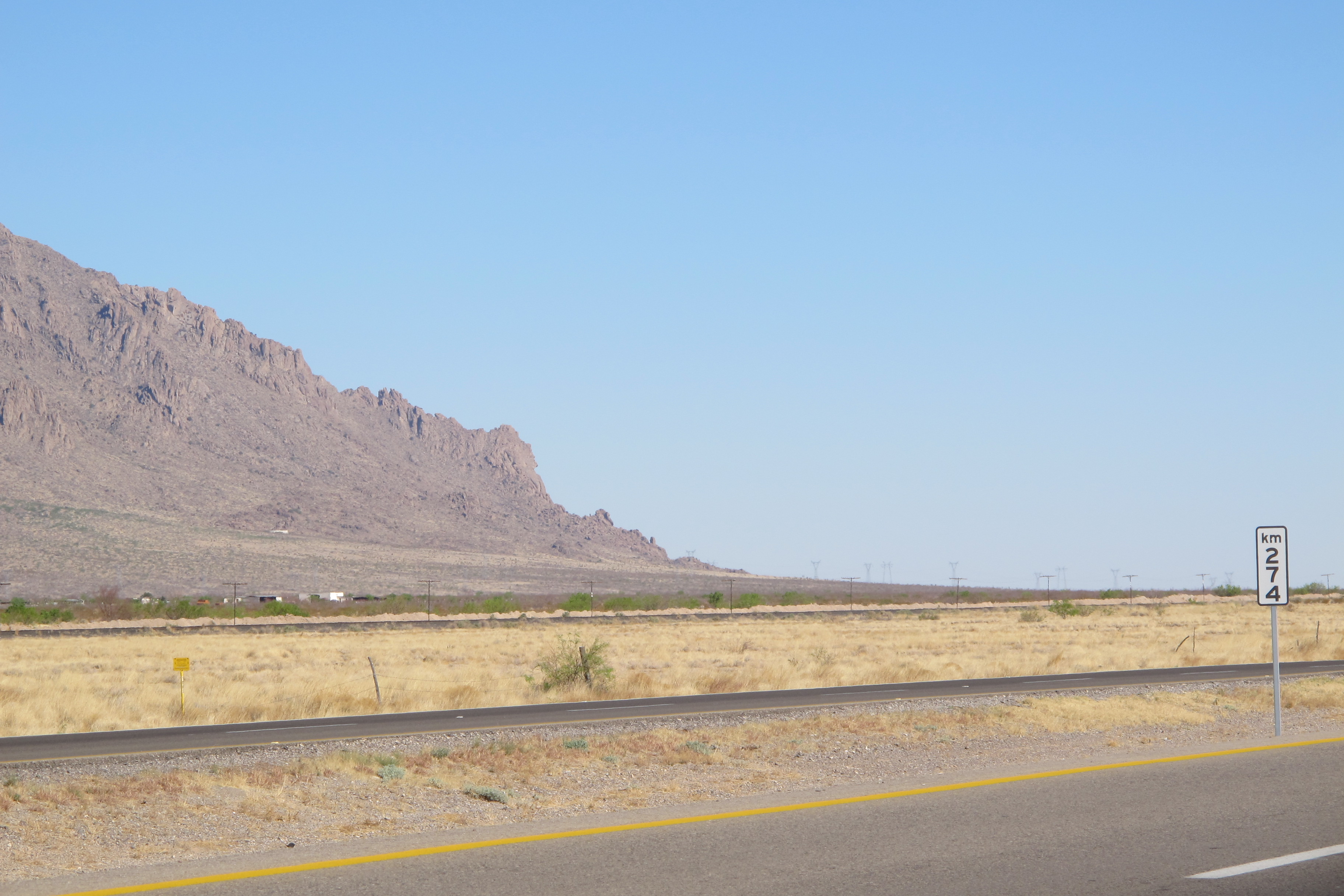
The "Profile of Christ" in Sierra Peñascos.

Name	Population (2005)
Villa Ahumada	8,753
Moctezuma	129
Ojo Caliente	509
Álamos de Peña	326
Carrizal	102
Total Municipality	11,727

=== Villa Ahumada ===
Villa Ahumada (officially Miguel Ahumada) is a town and seat of the municipality of Ahumada in the state of Chihuahua in northern Mexico. It is located along Highway 45, about 130 km south of Ciudad Juárez and 247 km north of the city of Chihuahua. As of 2010, the town had a population of 8,575.

The city has several roadside restaurants and burrito stands and is known for its good cheese.

Villa Ahumada entered the international news in 2008 when it was terrorized for several hours by an out of town gang. This was presumably part of the wave of drug-smuggling related violence in Mexico that resulted in about 4,000 deaths between early 2007 and mid-2008. At the night of May 19, 2008, dozens of men drove through town, firing assault rifles and killing the police chief, two police officers and three civilians, and abducting at least 10 people. The remaining policemen then left, and the state and federal governments sent troops to restore order. Officials did not offer a theory about the perpetrators. According to local rumors, the town's drug dealers had been aligned with police and were linked to the Juárez Cartel. After a local drug boss was killed and another arrested, a rival gang was possibly trying to take over the drug trade along the route from Ciudad Juárez to the state of Sinaloa. A similar attack occurred on February 10, 2009, in which 9 people were apparently kidnapped and driven to a ranch near El Vergel. The Mexican military pursued the assailants and 21 people were killed in the shootout.

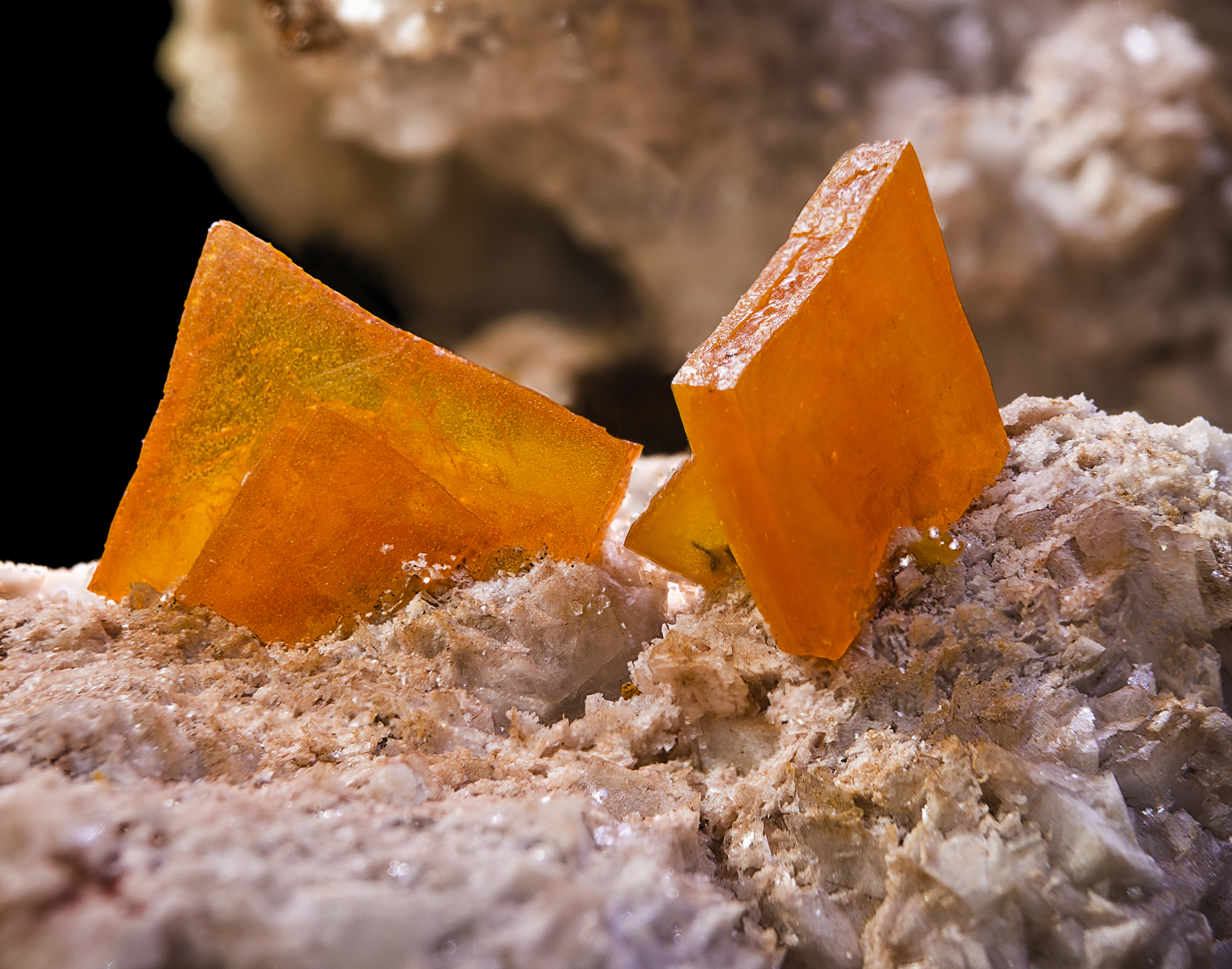
Wulfenite specimen from Erupcion Mine.

A number of small mining districts are located in the hills around Villa Ahumada, and the area is noted for its crystal specimens of wulfenite and other minerals.

=== Carrizal ===
Carrizal is a rural community located in Ahumada Municipality, Chihuahua, Mexico. It had a population of 102 inhabitants at the 2010 census, and is situated at an elevation of 1,120 meters above sea level.

Carrizal was founded November 26, 1772 as a Jesuit mission named San Fernando de las Amarillas del Carrizal. It was also the location of a presidio and civilian settlement, tasked to guard the route of the Camino Real de Tierra Adentro.
