= Emilio Kosterlitzky =

Russian-born Mexican colonel (1853–1928)

Colonel Emilio Kosterlitzky
- Эмилио Иван Костерлицкий
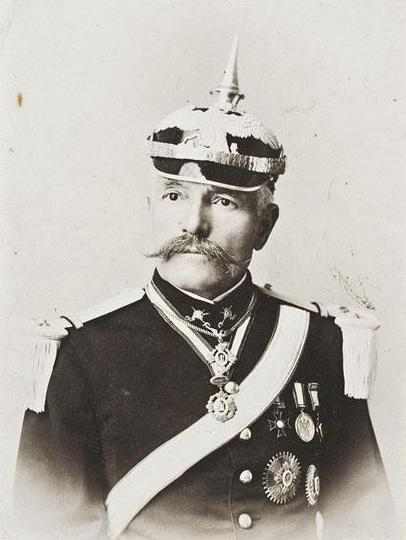
- Kosterlitzky in full military uniform, 1912
- Born: 16 November 1853; Moscow, Russian Empire
- Died: 2 March 1928 (aged 74); Los Angeles, California, U.S.
- Burial place: Calvary Cemetery
- Spouse: Francisca López
- Children: 2
- Military career
- Allegiance: Russia; Mexico
- Branch: Imperial Russian Navy (Mexico) Mexican Army
- Service years: 1871–1914
- Rank: Midshipman; Colonel
- Nicknames: Eagle of Sonora; Mexican Cossack
- Commands: Rurales; Federal Army
- Conflicts: Mexican Apache Wars; Yaqui Wars; Nogales Uprising; Mexican Revolution; Costa Oeste Campaign; Battle of Nogales (POW)
- Other work: Spy

Emilio Ivan Kosterlitzky (Russian: Эмилио Иван Костерлицкий, romanized: Emilio Ivan Kosterlitskiy; 16 November 1853 – 2 March 1928) was a Russian-born Mexican colonel during the Mexican Revolution. He had also served in the Mexican Apache Wars and Yaqui Wars. He is most noted for being the commander of the Mexican Rurales, or border police, during the late 19th century.

== Biography ==
Emil Kosterlitzky was born on 16 November 1853, in Moscow, to a German mother and Russian Cossack father. He was noted for his language ability; he spoke nine languages: Russian, Polish, Spanish, French, Italian, English, German, Danish, and Swedish.

In his teens, Emil joined the Russian Navy as a midshipman. By 1871, at the age of 18, he deserted his ship in Venezuela. Kosterlitzky then travelled to the Mexican state of Sonora, where he changed his name to Emilio and joined the Mexican Army.

== Conflicts and wars ==
=== Mexican Apache Wars ===
During the 1880s he fought in the Mexican Apache Wars. He also assisted American troops pursuing Apaches across the border under the 1882 United States–Mexico reciprocal border crossing treaty. Kosterlitzky became known to the American troops, who called him the "Mexican Cossack". In 1885, Kosterlitzky was appointed commander of the Gendarmería Fiscal, the customs guard for the Mexican government, by President Porfirio Díaz.

=== Yaqui Wars and Nogales Uprising ===
In March 1896, the United States Government had arrested Lauro Aguirre and Flores Chapa, who were both revolutionary insurgents, for being accused of engaging in revolutionary actions since they had established an anti-Díaz newspaper that claimed Porfirio Díaz, the Mexican president, had violated the Constitution of 1857. It was later concluded that both men were innocent. The plan was signed by twenty-three other people, including Aguirre, and another man named Tomas Urrea, the father of revolutionary Teresa Urrea. Teresa Urrea was suspected to be a mastermind since he had many close relationships with the people involved in an uprising. Around sixty Yaqui, Pima, and Mexican Revolutionaries united in a rebel band called ''Teresitas'' to participate in a raid.

On 12 August, the Teresitas had attacked. Kosterlitzky, who was in charge of many Mexican soldiers, had chased the Teresitas out of Nogales with the help of the U.S. 24th Infantry Regiment, under Brigadier General Frank Wheaton. Sources claimed that around 7 Mexican soldiers were killed, while the Teresitas had suffered equivalent casualties.

=== Mexican Revolution ===
==== Costa Oeste Campaign ====
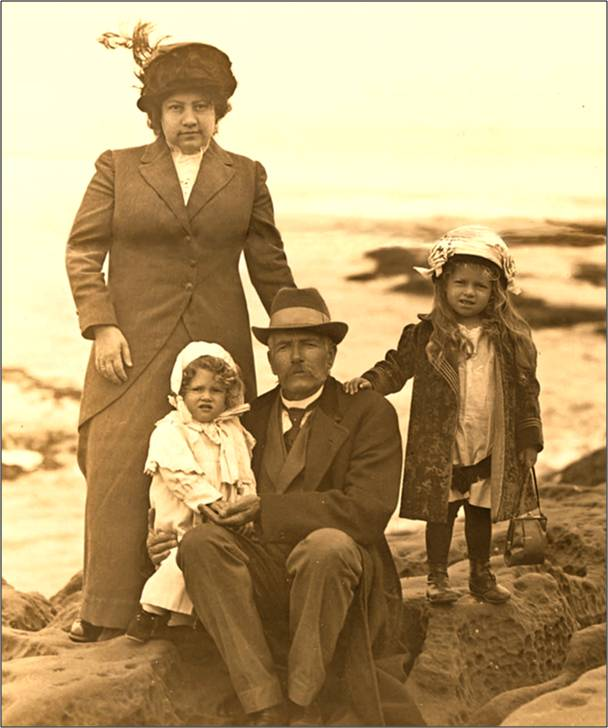
Kosterlitzky, his wife Francisca, and their two daughters, in Los Angeles as exiles from the Mexican Revolution.

In 1910, Kosterlitzky had clashed forces with Emil Lewis Holmdahl, who was an American mercenary. Holmdahl had previously worked for Díaz as a captain in the rurales, which Kosterlitzky was in command of, as a security guard for the American railway operating near Mazatlán. He had repelled a raid in late October of the same year. Holmdahl had defected from the government forces to create his own faction. Throughout most of January 1911, Holmdahl, alongside an unknown number of men, had captured small towns and villages including a majority of Nayarit near the West coast. He had plans to capture Tepic, but failed after his men had betrayed him and was lured to an ambush. Kosterlitzky had ended up executing 300 of his men.

==== Nogales ====
In 1913, Kosterlitzky was commanding a force of 400 men in Northern Mexico to help stop actions of Venustian Carranza and Pancho Villa during the Mexican Revolution. On 13 March, around 2,000 rebel forces, under General Alvaro Obregon, had attacked Kosterlitzky, and his 400 soldiers. Fighting only lasted for a few hours up until he was eventually captured in Nogales, Sonora, by the revolutionaries. His remaining soldiers had retreated to the border and surrendered to the American garrison of Nogales, Arizona. He was jailed until 1914, when he, his wife, Francisca, and two daughters moved to Los Angeles, California.

== Later life and death ==
After Kosterlitzky had moved to Los Angeles with his family, he became a translator for the U.S. Postal Service. During World War I, he pretended to be a German physician. Later in 1917, he was appointed as a special employee within the FBI. On 1 May 1922, he was appointed a Bureau special agent. Because of his unique qualifications, he was assigned to work on border cases and to conduct liaison with various Mexican informants and officials. He resigned from the FBI on 4 September 1926. He returned to Mexico in 1927, to investigate a plot against the government of the state of Baja California. Kosterlitzky died in Los Angeles on 2 March 1928, and is buried in Calvary Cemetery in East Los Angeles.

== See also ==
- Kelvin Grade Massacre
- Yaqui Wars
- Yaqui Uprising
- Battle of Mazocoba
- Tiburon Island Tragedy
- Cananea strike
- Arizona Rangers
