= Mexican Service Medal =

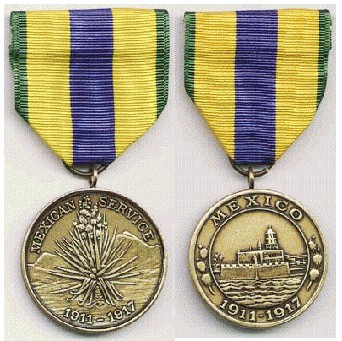
- Army (left) & Navy (right)
- Type: Military medal Campaign medal
- Awarded for: participation in engagements between armed forces of the United States and Mexico between April 12, 1911 and February 7, 1917.
- Presented by: Department of War and Department of the Navy
- Status: Obsolete
- Established: December 12, 1917
- Service ribbon and campaign streamer

The Mexican Service Medal was an award of the United States military for service in Mexico from 1911 to 1919.

== History ==
The Mexican Service Medal awarded by the Army was established by General Orders of the United States War Department on December 12, 1917. The Navy's Mexican Service Medal was established by Navy Department General Orders Number 365 on February 11, 1918, as amended by Navy Department General Orders No. 464 of April 27, 1919. The Mexican Service Medal recognizes those servicemen who performed military service against Mexican forces between April 12, 1911 and June 16, 1919.

To be awarded the Mexican Service Medal, a serviceman was required to perform military duty during the time period of eligibility and in one of the following military engagements.

- Veracruz Expedition: April 21 to November 23, 1914
- Punitive Expedition into Mexico: March 14, 1916 to February 7, 1917
- Buena Vista, Mexico: December 1, 1917
- The punitive expedition in the aftermath of the Brite Ranch raid on San Bernardino Canyon, Mexico, December 26, 1917
- La Grulla, Texas: January 8–9, 1918
- The aftermath of the Neville Ranch raid that resulted in a small action in the village of Pilares, Chihuahua: March 28, 1918
- For actions in Nogales, Arizona during the Battle of Nogales, November 1–26, 1915, or Battle of Ambos Nogales, August 27, 1918
- El Paso, Texas and Ciudad Juárez, Chihuahua for the Battle of Ciudad Juárez : June 15–16, 1919

The United States Navy issued the Mexican Service Medal to the sailors and Marines who participated in any of the above actions, as well as to servicemen who served aboard U.S. naval vessels patrolling Mexican waters between April 21 and November 26, 1914, or between March 14, 1916, and February 7, 1917.

The Mexican Service Medal was also awarded to any servicemen who was wounded or killed while participating in any action against hostile Mexican forces between April 12, 1911, and February 7, 1917.

Although the Mexican Service Medal was a single decoration, the U.S. Army and U.S. Navy issued two different versions of it. The Army version displays an engraving of a yucca plant, while the Navy version depicts the San Juan de Ulúa fortress in Veracruz harbor. Both versions display the annotation "1911 – 1917" on the bottom of the medal.

The Mexican Service Medal was a one-time decoration and there were no service stars authorized for those who had participated in multiple engagements. For those soldiers who had been cited for gallantry in combat, the Citation Star was authorized as a device to the Mexican Service Medal. There were no devices authorized for the Navy's version of the decoration.

A similar decoration, known as the Mexican Border Service Medal also existed for those who had performed support duty to Mexican combat expeditions from within the United States.

== Notable recipients ==
- General of the Armies John J. Pershing
- General of the Army Douglas MacArthur
- Fleet Admiral William D. Leahy, USN
- Fleet Admiral Ernest J. King, USN
- Fleet Admiral William Halsey Jr., USN
- Admiral Frank Friday Fletcher, USN
- Admiral Frank J. Fletcher, USN
- General George S. Patton
- Lieutenant General John A. Lejeune, USMC
- Rear Admiral Richard E. Byrd, USN
- Major General Smedley D. Butler, USMC
- Major General John H. Russell Jr., USMC

== See also ==
- Awards and decorations of the United States military
- Border War (1910–1918)
