= Neville Ranch raid =

1918 attack on a Texas ranch by Mexican rebels during the Bandit War

Coordinates: 30.4963°N 104.8674°W

Nevill Ranch raid
- Part of the Bandit War, Mexican Revolution
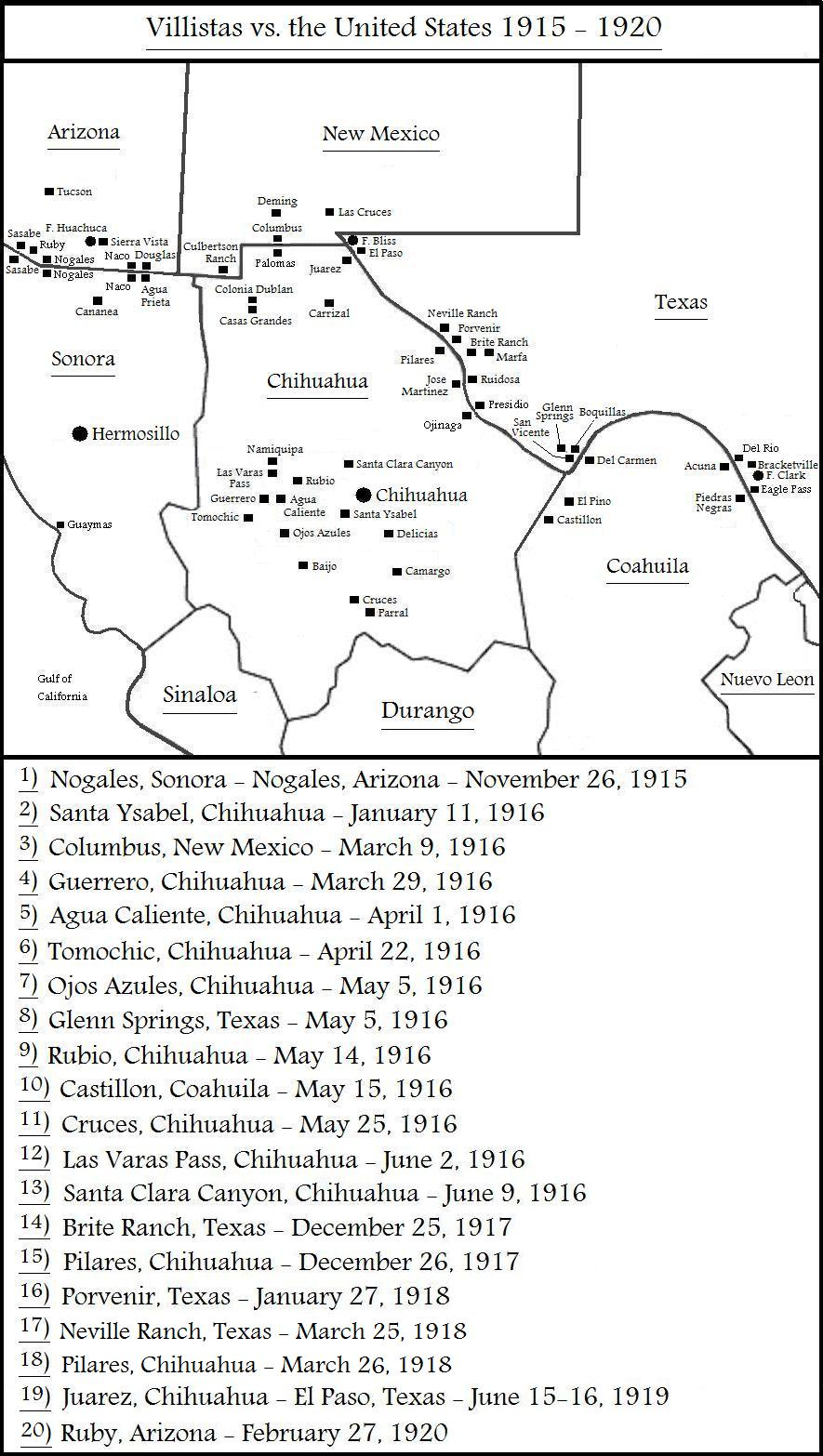
- Location: Presidio County, Texas
- Date: March 25, 1918
- Weapon: Small arms
- Deaths: 2

The Neville Ranch raid of the night of March 25, 1918, was the last serious attack on a Texas ranch by Mexican rebels during the Bandit War. Speculation was that Villistas were responsible for the raid in which two people were murdered. Afterwards the rebels withdrew to the village of Pilares, Chihuahua, in Mexican territory pursued by a group of United States cavalry. A small battle was fought at Pilares on the following day in which several more people were killed and the cavalry burned the village before they returned to Texas.

== Background ==
From the beginning of the Mexican Revolution in 1910, raids into Texas by Mexican bandits had become very common. Three people had been murdered in the Brite Ranch Raid on Christmas Day in 1917 and Villistas from the small border town of Porvenir were thought to be responsible. The Big Bend region was on high alert. On January 27, 1918, Texas Rangers and US Cavalry went to the settlement, surrounded the village, and searched it. Some of the women of the village alleged in later accounts that, while the soldiers were checking the houses, the Texas Rangers under Captain Monroe Fox gathered up fifteen Mexican men, took them to a nearby hill and executed them without evidence of their involvement in banditry. Archaeological digs in 2015 found evidence that US Cavalry firearms were discharged on the site. News of the Porvenir Massacre quickly spread on the Mexican side of the border, leading to speculation that the attack on Neville Ranch may have been in retaliation, since many of the raiders or their relatives had lived in Porvenir.

Edwin W. Neville owned Neville Ranch, which began about six miles northwest of Porvenir and ran for 18 miles along the Rio Grande river. It had no near neighbors and the lower ranch complex, where the attack occurred, had no telephone. Neville had lived there with his wife and 5 children, but after Brite Ranch raid he had moved his wife, Anna, his son, Thomas and three daughters, Edith, Grace, and Lois to a home in Van Horn. The day of the raid he was on the ranch with only his eldest son, Glenn, as well as his Mexican servant, Rosa Castillo, her husband and three children.

== The Raid ==
On March 25, 1918, while on garrison duty at Candelaria, Captain Leonard Matlock, 8th Cavalry, received information regarding an imminent attack on Neville Ranch. Matlock then sent out a patrol, under a Lieutenant Gaines, to warn Neville, but he was in Van Horn buying supplies. After hearing these same reports in town, Neville and his son made an eight-hour ride back to the ranch without stopping. Finding it unharmed, Edwin gathered with everyone in the family house to discuss the rumors about the imminent attack. At some point Glenn went to check on sounds from outside the house and, peering out a window, saw in the dim light some "fifty approaching horsemen" who then opened fire with small arms. The house providing insufficient cover, the Nevilles and the Castillos fled to a ditch about 300 yards away. Glenn was shot in the head and while he lay wounded the raiders approached and beat him to death with the butts of their rifles. Rosa was "shot and her body mutilated" as well as sexually assaulted in front of her children while Mr. Castillo escaped on a pony. After this, the raiders turned to pillaging the ranch of horses, food, clothing, bedding and other supplies. Edwin fled on foot and was later found "wandering" through the desert.

== Aftermath ==
Mr. Castillo found Lieutenant Gaines and his patrol six miles away from the ranch and told them what had happened. Gaines then followed the Castillo back to the lower Neville Ranch, arriving just after the raiders left, and from there he went to the upper ranch to inform his commander, Colonel George Langhorne, by telephone. Colonel Langhorne dispatched Captain Henry H. Anderson and Troop G, 8th Cavalry, from Everett Ranch, an army camp about thirty-four miles north of Candelaria. At the same time, Troop A, 8th Cavalry, was mobilized in Marfa and sent to Valentine by rail. From there they mounted up and set out for Neville Ranch. By 4:00 pm, on March 26, Captain Anderson had assembled both troops and a mule train for supplies at the ranch and was ready to begin pursuing the raiders. The troops crossed the Rio Grande into Chihuahua shortly thereafter and quickly found the raiders' trail. According to Colonel Langhorne, Anderson and his men followed them over rough mountainous country for about seventy miles before the latter doubled back and began heading towards Pilares. Unable to escape, the raiders laid an ambush for the cavalrymen near Pilares which turned into a running battle of eleven miles. Langhorne reported that people from Pilares and possibly some Carrancista soldiers reinforced the raiders as well. He said that a Carrancista officer named Enrique Montova had boasted, after the expedition, that he had fought the US forces and drove them out of the village while simultaneously pretending to help them.

When the battle was over, Captain Anderson ordered his men to burn all the buildings in Pilares except a single house. The cache of weapons his command found included German-made Mauser rifles, which hinted at German involvement with the village, and evidence linking the inhabitants to the raids on Brite and Neville Ranch. The US troops then returned to Texas just before the arrival of a larger force of Carrancista cavalry. Only one US citizen, Private Carl Alberts, was killed. Mexican casualties range from ten to thirty-three killed and another eight wounded. Colonel Langhorne said that the soldiers found horses and equipment belonging to Neville's ranch, Glenn's body, about 10 dead, and speculated that the raiders had killed a great many more than that. There were 29 in the raid, and the report as we checked it up showed there were about 33 killed. We lost Private Albert of A Troop in that fight."

== See also ==
- Garza Revolution
- Las Cuevas War
