= William H. Sage =

American military officer (1859–1922)

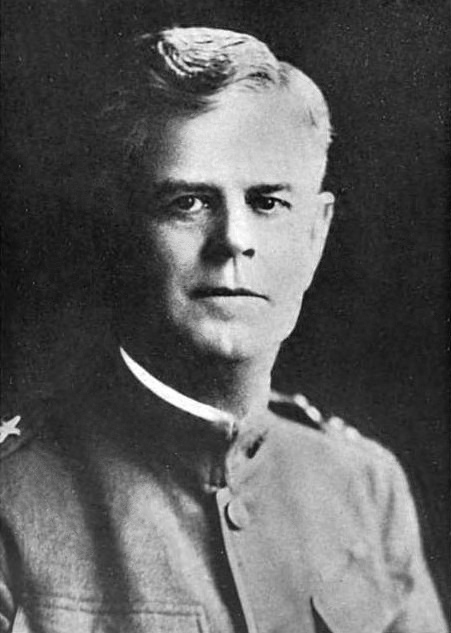
- Sage as a major general during World War I
- Born: April 6, 1859; Centerville, New York, US
- Died: June 3, 1922 (aged 63); Fort Crook, Omaha, Nebraska, US
- Burial place: Arlington National Cemetery
- Relatives: Nathaniel McLean (father in law)
- Military career
- Allegiance: United States of America
- Branch: United States Army
- Service years: 1882–1922
- Rank: Major General
- Unit: 23d Infantry Regiment
- Commands: 12th Infantry Regiment; Officer Candidate School, Fort Snelling, Minnesota; 38th Infantry Division; Camp Funston, Kansas; 2nd Brigade, American Expeditionary Forces; 12th Infantry Brigade; Fort D. A. Russell, Wyoming
- Conflicts: Spanish–American War; Philippine–American War: Battle of Zapote River (1899); Border War (1910–19): Battle of Nogales (1915); World War I
- Awards: Medal of Honor

William Hampden Sage (April 6, 1859 – June 3, 1922) was a major general in the United States Army and a Medal of Honor recipient for his actions during the Battle of Zapote Bridge on 13 June 1899 during the Philippine–American War.

== Early life and education ==
Sage was born in Centerville, New York on April 6, 1859, and was the son of William Newton Sage, a career army officer and American Civil War veteran. The young Sage graduated from West Point in 1882.

== Military career ==
He was commissioned a second lieutenant in the 5th Infantry Regiment. Sage was professor of military science at Central University from 1892 to 1893. During the Spanish–American War and Philippine–American War, he served in the Philippines as aide-de-camp to Samuel Ovenshine. Sage continued to serve in the Philippines, including assignments as adjutant of the 1st and 2nd Brigades, 1st Division, XIII Army Corps; and adjutant of the 3rd District (Mindanao and Jolo).

Sage graduated from the United States Army War College in 1907, after which he was assigned as adjutant of the Department of the Columbia. He later returned to the Philippines, where he served as adjutant of the Department of Luzon and then adjutant of Fort William McKinley.

As lieutenant colonel of the 30th Infantry, he served at Fort William H. Seward, Alaska, in 1912 and 1913, afterwards carrying out a temporary recruiting assignment in Albany, New York. He served with the 30th Infantry on the border in Texas during the Pancho Villa Expedition. In 1915, he was promoted to colonel and assigned to command the 12th Infantry at Nogales, Arizona, leading American forces in repulsing Villista harassing attacks against the city on 26 November 1915 in the Battle of Nogales.

At the start of World War I, Sage was promoted to brigadier general and appointed to command the Officer Candidate School at Fort Snelling, Minnesota. He was later promoted to temporary major general and named to command the 38th Division at Camp Shelby, Mississippi. In 1918, he returned to his permanent rank of brigadier general and commanded the garrison at Camp Funston, Kansas. He was later assigned to command a provisional brigade, which was organized as 2nd Brigade, American Expeditionary Forces, and he led this unit in France and Germany during post-war demobilization and occupation.

After the war, Sage commanded the 12th Infantry Brigade at Camp Grant, Illinois.

He was in command at Fort D. A. Russell in Wyoming at the time of his death.

== Death ==
Sage died at Fort Crook in Omaha, Nebraska, while en route to Walter Reed Hospital. At the time of his final illness and death, he was within a month of retiring. He was buried at Arlington National Cemetery.

== Family ==
Sage was married in 1885 to Elizabeth Maud McLean (1862-1943), the daughter of General Nathaniel McLean. Their children included William H. Sage Jr., a 1909 West Point graduate who served in the Corps of Engineers and was a World War I veteran, and Nathaniel McLean Sage.

== Medal of Honor citation ==
Rank and organization: Captain, 23d U.S. Infantry. Place and date: Near Zapote River, Luzon, Philippine Islands, June 13, 1899. Entered service at: Binghamton, N.Y. Birth: Centerville, N.Y. Date of issue: July 24, 1902.

Citation:

With 9 men volunteered to hold an advanced position and held it against a terrific fire of the enemy estimated at 1,000 strong. Taking a rifle from a wounded man, and cartridges from the belts of others, Capt. Sage himself killed 5 of the enemy.

== See also ==
- List of Medal of Honor recipients
- List of Philippine–American War Medal of Honor recipients
- List of United States Military Academy alumni (Medal of Honor)
