= Battle of Mazocoba =

Battle between Mexican Army and Yaquis, 1900

- Part of the Yaqui Wars, Mexican Indian Wars
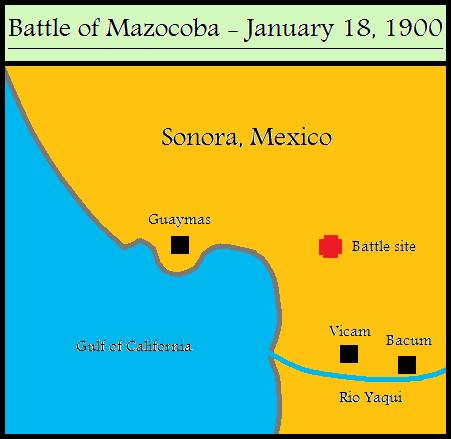
Date	January 18, 1900
Location	near Guaymas, Sonora, Mexico
Result	Mexican victory: Yaquis Retreat

Belligerents
(Mexico) Federals	Yaqui

Commanders and leaders
(Mexico) Lorenzo Torres	Tetabiate; Teresa Urrea

Strength
1,000–3,000	2,000

Casualties and losses
89 killed 210 wounded 54 killed 125 wounded	~90 killed or wounded 66 captured ~397 killed ~1,000 captured ~1,000 killed

The Battle of Mazocoba, or the Mazocoba massacre, was a major engagement of the Yaqui Wars that was fought in Sonora, Mexico. On January 18, 1900, a Mexican Army expedition encountered hundreds of Yaqui renegades about twenty miles east of Guaymas. During the battle that followed, several hundred people were killed or wounded and over 1,000 Yaquis were taken prisoner.

== Battle ==
By the turn of the 19th century, the Yaqui people and the Mexicans had been fighting each other for years though there were occasional periods of peace. In 1897, the Mexican Army officer General Lorenzo Torres opened up negotiations with the Yaqui Chief Tetabiate, or Juan Maldonado, who led a band of several hundred people. In May 1897 they signed a peace treaty at Ortiz which, among other things, called for the Yaqui to abandon their traditional lifestyle and become individual land owners. Tetabiate and about four hundred of his people surrendered but shortly thereafter they returned to the Sierra del Bacatete, west of Guaymas, to continue raiding. The situation became more serious in August 1899 when the Yaquis at Bácum and Vícam took up arms. General Torres had been ignoring the terms of the peace treaty by continuing to occupy Yaqui territory so over 2,000 warriors assembled along the Rio Yaqui. During the ensuing battle, the Yaquis suffered many casualties and had to retreat. After that, Tetabiate led in between 2,000 and 3,000 people onto, a rocky desert plateau roughly twenty-five square miles in size and about twenty-five miles east of Guaymas. General Torres responded by fielding the largest army ever sent against the Yaqui, over 5,000 men, both federal and state soldiers. According to conflicting accounts, on January 18, 1900, General Torres was leading a force of 1,000 to as many as 3,000 soldiers when he encountered Tetabiate and about 2,000 of his warriors in the Mazocoba.

The New York Times issued a newspaper story on February 3, 1900, that said Tetabiate and Santa Teresa were heading to Guaymas, with their band, to capture the port, and they had only gone eight miles before the Mexicans caught up. It also said that there were other Yaquis "still hold[ing] the mouth of the [Rio] Yaqui" and that they had stopped all steamships from entering or exiting the river. According to the same New York Times article, which incorrectly stated that the battle occurred on January 25, fighting began at 8:00 am and lasted for three hours, by which time General Torres and eighty-nine of his men were killed. Another 210 were captured and fifty-nine men were missing. General Torres was not actually killed however, and continued fighting the Yaquis for months afterwards. One other account puts the Mexicans' losses at fifty-four killed and 125 wounded, but this is likely false as it makes no mention of the several dozen men who went missing during the fight. The battle was mostly fought on foot, both sides used big boulders for cover, and it ended when the Yaquis retreated back to the Sierra del Bacatete. They were not pursued and instead the Mexicans withdrew. Yaqui casualties also differ widely though it is generally recognized that at least 397 men, women and children were killed while about 1,000 more were captured. Several of the natives committed suicide rather than surrender. Other accounts put the Yaqui death toll at over 1,000 while the New York Times said that only ninety were killed or wounded and sixty-six were captured.

== Aftermath ==
After the battle, Colonel García Peña estimated the Yaqui strength to be in between 900 and 1,040, held up in the Bacatetes, though by the end of the year General Torres estimated that there were only about 300. Tetabiate himself was killed by one of his own men in 1901 and by August the Mexican Army had ended its campaign. This was mainly because of how expensive it was to wage war against the Yaquis and due to President Porfirio Diaz's "extermination and deportation" policy. The thought of removing the Yaquis from northern Mexico had been brought up as early as the 1860s but it wasn't until 1902 that Diaz put the idea into action. The Yaqui were the main target for deportation but Opata, Pimas and Mayos were also removed. Most of the natives were rounded up by Colonel Emilio Kosterlitsky, sent to San Blas, in Nayarit, and then from there to the henequen plantations in the Yucatan or to the sugarcane plantations in Oaxaca. Many died in captivity, either by killing themselves or by foul treatment. Those who escaped deportation were dispersed across northern Mexico and some even settled across the international border in southern Arizona. Evelyn Hu-DeHart, a history professor at Brown University, says that the Yaquis "had become the most widely scattered native people of North America. ... Not even the Cherokee, whose deportation in 1835 from Georgia to Oklahoma had initiated a scattering over the United States, were so widely dispersed." Though the army ceased their campaign in August 1901, it wasn't until January 1909 that the majority of the Yaquis in the Sierra del Bacatete surrendered. The Mexican government allowed some to settle on vacant land in the Rio Yaqui valley but the rest were apparently deported. Between 1902 and 1908, between 8,000 and 15,000 Yaquis, out of an estimated population of 30,000, were deported.

The Yaquis who surrendered in 1909 were led by Luis Buli, who agreed to help the Mexicans track down the remaining renegades under Luis Espinosa. Their efforts were largely ineffective though and when the Mexican Revolution began in 1910 Espinosa and his band were still fighting their own war.

== See also ==
- Removal of the Eastern Indians
