= Battle of Nogales (1915) =

Armed engagement during the Mexican Revolution

Second Battle of Nogales
- Part of the Mexican Revolution, Border War
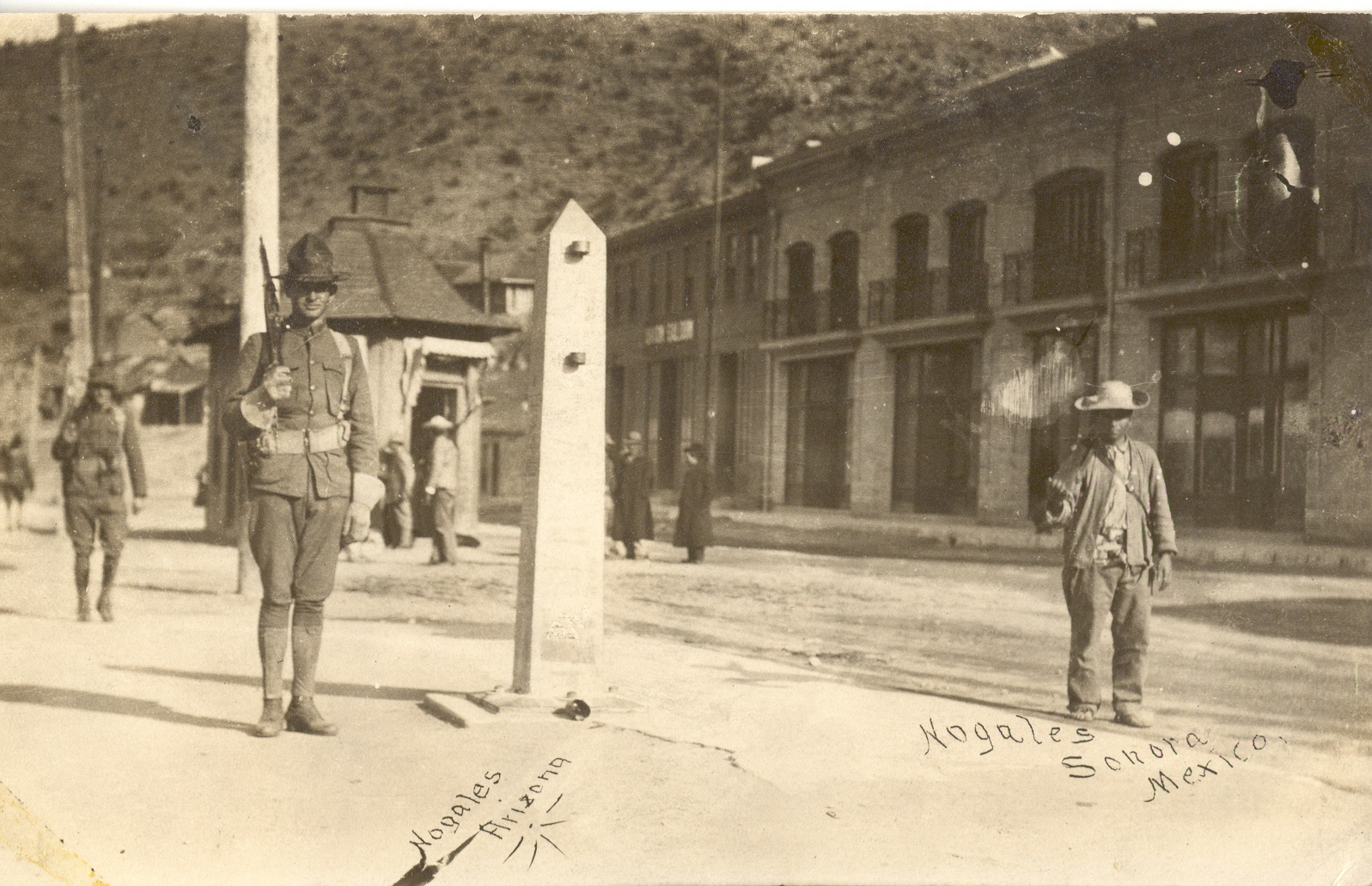
- American and Mexican soldiers guarding International Street in Ambos Nogales. The obelisk in the center is a border marker, which still stands today.
Date	November 26, 1915
Location	Nogales, Sonora, Mexico; Nogales, Arizona, United States

Belligerents
Conventionists; División del Norte	Constitutionalists; Constitutional Army	United States

Commanders and leaders
Unknown	Alvaro Obregón	(United States) William H. Sage
- Casualties ~70 killed or wounded

The Second Battle of Nogales was a three-sided military engagement of the Mexican Revolution, fought in November 1915 at the border towns of Nogales, Sonora, and Nogales, Arizona. On the morning of November 26, rebel forces of Pancho Villa, who occupied Nogales, Sonora, began firing on United States Army soldiers in Nogales, Arizona. The Americans responded with counter fire for over two hours before a force of Carrancistas (AKA Constitutionalistas) arrived to attack the Villistas. Later that day, the Constitutionalistas accidentally opened fire on American soldiers and another short skirmish was fought. The battle resulted in the deaths of several Mexicans and was the first significant engagement fought between Villistas and the United States military.

== Background ==
In November 1915, Pancho Villa was engaged in the major Battle of Agua Prieta, a battle he ultimately lost. Short on men and supplies, Villa sent a detachment to Nogales, Sonora, and the town was occupied without opposition. Shortly thereafter, a series of raids were launched across the international border into Arizona. It is not known which faction was responsible for the attacks, as both were known for raiding in southern Arizona, but it was most likely the Villistas. According to author Francisco Arturo Rosales, Villa's intentions at the time were to retaliate against the United States for their aid to Carrancista forces at Agua Prieta and to destabilize the region enough to where President Venustiano Carranza could no longer control it. On November 21, two Buffalo Soldiers from Troop F, 10th Cavalry, were fired on while manning a border observation post near "Monument 117". The cavalrymen returned the fire and in the gunfight Private Willie Norman was wounded. On the next day, five "armed Mexicans" attacked a small camp of Troop F soldiers along the Santa Cruz River near Nogales, Arizona. The soldiers returned fire with revolvers and killed two of the raiders. On November 25, some "guerrillas" crossed the border and attacked a 10th Cavalry outpost that protected Mascarena's Ranch. Again the soldiers were from Troop F and they repulsed the raiders, one Mexican was wounded and captured. The situation was about to get much more serious though.

== Battle ==
On the next day, with Obregon's forces approaching the city, the Villistas began evacuating Nogales, Sonora. However, their evacuation was disrupted when a train used to transport Villista troops out of the city was captured by Obregon's troops. After the remainder of the evacuation was delayed, Villista snipers began shooting at American soldiers of the 12th Infantry who were guarding the border in Nogales, Arizona. In response to the sniping, the American commander of the 12th Infantry, Colonel William H. Sage, ordered his men to form a skirmish line and prepare for battle.

The line was formed at International Street, a dirt road and the border between Nogales, Arizona and Nogales, Sonora. Also, some American snipers took positions on the rooftops overlooking the border. When the order was given to open fire at about 10:00 am, Colonel Sage made sure that his men were only shooting at the hostile Mexicans and not at any of the noncombatants. Some American units crossed the border during the fighting but when General Alvaro Obregon and his army arrived at about 12:40, Colonel Sage ordered his men to cease fire and return to camp. Obregon continued the battle for some time while the Americans watched from the border line. However, later that day, some 10th Cavalry sentries were fired upon by Obregon's troops from atop a hill. For thirty minutes the Buffalo Soldiers engaged the Mexicans, killing two, but eventually another cease fire was ordered and the commanders from both sides exchanged apologies. Obregon's men said they had mistaken the American troopers for Villistas.

== Aftermath ==
Only one American soldier is known to have been killed, Private Stephen D. Little, 12th Infantry Regiment, and five others were wounded, but other accounts say as many as three Americans died. Official American casualty returns show that Private Little mortally wounded and Privates Herbert Cates and Arthur Saupe were wounded in action. All three Americans were members of Company L of the 12th Infantry. Francisco Rosales says that the Americans killed sixty Mexicans in total and wounded several more. In honor of Private Little, the War Department changed the name of Camp Nogales to Camp Stephen D. Little, a base that would harbor more than 10,000 men by 1916. The camp was located along what is now Western Avenue from Grand Avenue to Interstate 19.

The next major incident between the Americans and Pancho Villa occurred on January 11, 1916. Villista forces stopped a train near Santa Isabel, Chihuahua, removed around 17 American passengers by gunpoint and then shot them all. Only one man survived by faking death. He later crawled away from the site while the Villistas were busy "stripping and mutilating" the dead. The victims were mining engineers who worked for ASARCO, they had been invited to Mexico by President Carranza to reopen the Cusihuiriachic mines south of Chihuahua. Their bodies were later recovered by a "special train" and taken back to the United States.

U.S. President Woodrow Wilson initially refused to intervene in Mexico on behalf of the massacre, however, on March 9, 1916, Pancho Villa attacked the town of Columbus, New Mexico, killing eighteen Americans and burning several buildings. After that Wilson ordered General Pershing to launch the Mexican Expedition, an attempt to capture or kill Pancho Villa.

== See also ==
- Yaqui Uprising
- Garza Revolution
- Las Cuevas War
