= Tomochic Rebellion =

Rebellion in Mexico

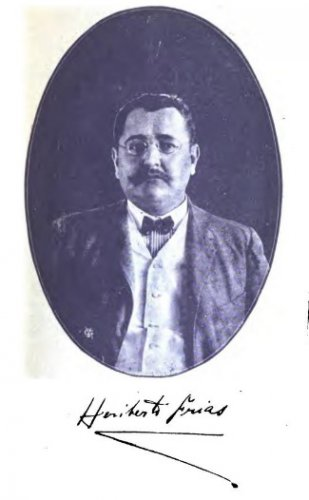
Heriberto Frias: author of The Battle of Tomochic

The Tomochic Rebellion was a violent confrontation between rural villagers and the army of the Mexican Government from 1891- 1892 in the town of Tomochi, a small rural town in the mountainous Guerrero district of the Mexican state of Chihuahua. Led by Cruz Chavez, a notable local and charismatic figure, the rebellion was one of a series of uprisings against the government calling for social reform and religious autonomy. The rebellion initially met with success but was eventually crushed by government forces in 1892. The defiance of the tomochitecos became a symbol of resistance against tyranny and became enshrined in Mexican folklore. Furthermore, the rebellion was unique as it was one of the first religiously inspired revolts against the state, with the rebels rallying behind the cult of Teresa Urrea as a symbol of their defiance of the regime.

== Background ==
At the end of the 19th century the Mexican government under the Porfirio regime began a process of centralisation. Regional areas that historically enjoyed relative autonomy increasingly began to experience state authority. The remoteness of the northern provinces of Chihuahua state and the threat of Apache Indians resulted in the government initially relying on military colonists to maintain order. These local serrano inhabitants, used to independence and with a strong subscription to regionalism, were destined to clash with the centralisation policies of the Federal government. The appointment of local officials by the central government caused further resentment by the tomochitecos of the regime. Changes in technology were also seen as an intrusion of independence by the residents of the remote frontier regions. The coming of the northwestern railway and lumber workers from the United States was a major source of the conflict. These remote regions were instantly connected to the economy of the United States through the railway, becoming footholds for American timber, mining and agricultural companies. These large corporations gained animosity from northern communities as more and more land was taken over, displacing small local land holders. The Guerrero district also experienced drought in the early 1890s bringing hardship and further depressed the local economy. The stealing of religious paintings from the local chapel by the captain of the guard of the governor Lauro Carillo while the governor was on a campaign trek was a sign to the tomochitecos of the disconnect between the central government and themselves. It was in this economic and political situation that the villagers of Tomochic under the leadership of Cruz Chavez declared their faith in Teresa Urrea, a local woman who had become a religious folk figure after reportedly seeing visions from god whilst experiencing convulsions and declared that the only authority that they would recognise was that of God alone.

== Course of the Rebellion ==
=== Initial skirmish ===
As the drought worsened in the northern regions, Cruz Chavez attempted to organise a procession of holy relics in hope of alleviating the worsening conditions. The Mexican catholic church had banned such proceedings unless express permission was granted and hence regarded Chavez's actions as an act of defiance to the authority of the church. It was the threatened suspension of church services by the new centrally appointed priest that was the last straw for Chavez and his followers. On 7 December 1891 the villagers of Tomochic clashed in a brief confrontation with federal troops which resulted in Chavez and his followers fleeing into the surrounding Sierras and began their journey to Carbora to seek the folk saint Teresa Urrea. The next confrontation between federal troops and the rebels occurred at Los Alamo ranch on 26 December where the rebels ambushed an army patrol commanded by Captain Emilio Enriquez. The federal troops were routed and the rebels continued onto Carbora in search of Teresa Urrea. Not finding her there, Cruz and his followers decided to return to Tomochic.

=== A Relative Peace ===
After the ambush at Los Alamo a chase was organised and led by Colonel Lorenzo Torreres. With no success a change in tactics was ordered by Governor Carrillo. Rather than risk another ambush the rebels would be allowed to return to the village unmolested where they would stay until the army was ready to launch a full-scale assault. However, politics was to get in the way and with an election looming Carrillo decided that negotiation would be the best option to solve the crisis. The state negotiator, Tomas Dozal y Hermosillo, after meeting with Chavez recommended to the governor that the villagers be left alone until they realise that they had mistakenly placed their faith. With Diaz more concerned about other affairs, the Tomochic issue was cast as a low priority and so the villagers returned to their daily routines. It was the conflict on 15 May 1892 at Navajoa that put the Tomochic affair back in the spotlight. Around 200 native Indians of the Mayo and Yaqui tribes attacked the mining town of Navajoa in the name of Saint Terresa Urrea. This was enough for Diaz to order the commencement of the assault on Tomochic.

=== The Second Confrontation ===
On 2 September 1892 Federal troops under the command of General Jose Maria Rangel marched on the tomochitecos. Poor intelligence resulted in Rangel severely underestimating the strength of the rebels, thinking that his force would only encounter a total of 38 rebels. Three columns made up of militia and regular infantry formed a V and moved towards the village with the centre column soon coming under heavy fire by a nearby cemetery. Captain Vergara, commanding one of the flanks of the V, was shot almost as soon as firing began. Colonel Ramirez commanding the central part of the wedge was struck in the shoulder amidst the firefight. With the leadership of the army force in disarray the federal forces began to lose cohesion as a fighting force resulting in the decimation of the task force and the capture of General Rangel as well as the commander of the militia unit involved in the battle. The federal troops, marching defeated back into the city of Guerrero described the tomochitecos as "a terrible lot . . . they know their Winchesters inside out; since they were children they have kept up a constant struggle against Apaches and bandits; they can run like a deer through the sierras without putting a foot wrong; but they are excessively ignorant and proud". Seeing the devastation caused by the tomochitecos the city soon became panic stricken fearing an attack on the city itself. This second confrontation struck home to Diaz and in order to prevent others from joining the cause of the tomochitecos a renewed campaign was ordered.

=== The Final Confrontation ===
The Tomochitecos, desperate for more fighters, were joined by a bandit named Pedero Chappero and his gang. However their loyalty to the cause of the tomochitecos was questionable. Chavez allowed them to fight alongside the rebels as long as they remained pious and loyal to the cause. The army, still reeling from the disaster of early September, began a renewed campaign against the rebels of Tomochic. The new federal army campaign against the tomochitecos began with confusion with General Felipe Cruz, drunk and in a stupor, leading a cavalry charge slashing at cornfields at Le Generala, thinking the corn stalks were the rebels. General Rosendo Marquez was ordered by President Diaz to take command of the campaign. The army now outnumbered the rebels at least 15 to 1. On the morning of October 20 the initial army offensive was halted by the rebels. Faced with an entrenched enemy General Rangel who was back in command changed tactics and decided to lay siege to the village. On 25 October federal troops attacked the cave in which the newly recruited Pedero Chapparo and his brigand of outlaws was holding out resulting in the loss of life of 23 soldiers. With the cave now ion the hands of the army a full on assault of the village could be conducted. On 26 October, federal troops attacked the village church that was the stronghold for the rebels burning it to the ground with the remaining rebels fleeing to other defensive positions. The final assault by the federales occurred on 29 October against the 13 remaining rebels holding up inside their cuartel. After the army had stormed the building the remaining six survivors including Cruz and his two brothers Manuel and David were executed, ending the rebellion.

== Aftermath ==
The Tomochic Rebellion became a thorn in the side of the Porfirio regime. The altercation with federal forces resulted in the deaths of 300 male townsfolk and numerous women and children. The women and children who survived the siege totalled 40 and 70 respectively. Foreign media outlets portrayed the rebellion as a deepest revolution against the Mexican government. Local newspapers such as El Monitor Republicano demanded an investigation into the actions of the government and El Tiempo stated that extermination was not permitted by a civilised country. Newspapers in the United States heralded the tomochitecos as defenders of a new alamo, fighting for their liberty against a repressive regime. Teresa Urrea was sent into exile by the Diaz government even though she denied her political involvement in the rebellion. The Mexican Revolution of 1910 was just around the corner, making Tomochic an important precursor to the eventual overthrow of Diaz and the installation of Francisco Madero as president.

== The Importance of Religion ==
Religion was vital in determining the course of the Tomochic Rebellion. The Mexican countryside in the late 18th century was awash with millennialism and the belief that those who fought for God would not only be martyrs but would on some instances also be reincarted in the flesh. It was this religious fervour that inspired the tomochitecos to hold out for so long against overwhelming numbers. Cruz Chavez believed that the rebels were condemned to die and were on a god given mission. It would be only through their deaths that the new millennium would arrive.

== In popular culture ==
The events at Tomochic became the subject of a serialised novel written by Heriberto Frias. This novel criticised the actions of the government in dealing with the tomechitecos and appeared in the opposition party's newspaper el Democrata. The novel first appeared in 24 parts anonymously on 14 March and ran through to 14 April 1893 until the paper was shut down by the Porfiro regime for sprouting antigovernment ideas. The events at Tomochic are also encapsulated in folk ballads called corridos. The events at Tomochic have also been used by successive governments since the revolution to support claims of legitimacy, particularly in the 1960s where the Office of the Secretary of Public Education published magazines and comic books on the history of the rebellion.
