= Raid on Glenn Springs =

- Part of the Bandit War, Mexican Revolution
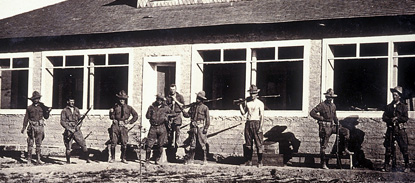
- Nine men of the 14th Cavalry in front of the Ellis home at Glenn Springs, Texas in 1916.
Date	May 5, 1916
Location	Brewster County, Texas 29.176°N 103.157°W
Result	Villista/Carrancista victory

Belligerents
United States	Villistas; Carrancistas

Commanders and leaders
(United States) Charles E. Smyth	Natividad Alvarez (POW); Rodriguez Ramirez

Strength
9 cavalry	~80 cavalry

Casualties and losses
3 killed ~5 wounded	~1 killed ~3 wounded 1 captured
- Civilian Casualties 1 killed, 2 captured

The raid on Glenn Springs occurred on the night of May 5–6, 1916, when Mexican Villistas and Carrancistas attacked the towns of Boquillas and Glenn Springs, Texas. In Glenn Springs, the raiders burned several buildings and fought a three-hour battle with a small force of American soldiers who were stationed there. At the same time, a second party of rebels robbed a general store and a silver mine in Boquillas. Four Americans were killed and the rebels took two hostages to Coahuila. In response to the attack, the United States Army launched a short punitive expedition into Mexico, fought with the rebels, and rescued the captives.

== Background ==
Following the Mexican federal victory at the Battle of Celaya in April 1915, Mexican rebel Pancho Villa led the remnants of his once large army back to northern Mexico. By 1916, Villa and his men were in desperate need of food and provisions to continue their revolution, so they devised a plan to raid the American border town of Columbus, New Mexico. On the early morning of March 9, 1916, approximately 500 mounted Villistas attacked and burned the town, though not long after that they were encountered by some 300 American troops. After a pitched battle, the Villistas were defeated and pursued back into Mexico, having lost nearly 200 killed, wounded, or captured. Eighteen Americans died in the engagement, including ten civilians and eight soldiers, an outrage that incited President Woodrow Wilson to authorize a punitive expedition into Mexico to capture or kill Villa. The Pancho Villa Expedition, as it became known, was under the command of Gen. John J. Pershing and it lasted from March 14, 1916, to February 7, 1917. Starting from various camps and forts along the border, Pershing headed into Chihuahua where his men engaged the Villistas on multiple occasions. Pershing was able to capture or kill several rebel commanders but Pancho Villa got away, and his rebels continued to launch raids on U.S. territory while American troops were in Mexico. Tension along the international border between Texas and Mexico was high during the Mexican Revolution. Raids into southern Texas were very common, so to help protect the Big Bend region, President Wilson allowed troops to occupy the area in June 1915.

Boquillas and Glenn Springs were just small settlements at the time, about 12 miles apart, and only nine soldiers from the 14th Cavalry guarded at the former and none at the latter. Glenn Springs was located just south of Chilicotal Mountain and centered around a small spring named after the first settler in the area who was killed at the site by Comanches. The town was home to some 80 people, who were employed mainly by a candelilla wax factory, owned by "Captain" C.D. Wood and W.K. Ellis. The Ellis family also owned the general store, which was managed by C.G. Compton and his family. The inhabitants, who were mostly Mexican-Americans, lived in a "scattered" neighborhood of about 50 jacales concentrated at one end of town. Boquillas was even smaller than Glenn Springs. Located along the Rio Grande, across from the mining town of Del Carmen, Boquillas had a general store, owned by Jesse Deemer, and several jacales.

== Raid ==
On May 5, 1916, just 57 days after the Battle of Columbus, Lt. Col. Natividad Alvarez launched his attack with about 60 to 200 men (accounts of the rebels' strength differ but there was likely no more than 80 involved). Though Col. Alvarez was a follower of Pancho Villa, on the march from Torreón to Texas he recruited both Carrancistas and fellow Villistas. Alvarez divided his command into two prongs; he led the first against Boquillas while at the same time Rodriguez Ramirez led the second against Glenn Springs. Because it was Cinco de Mayo, the Mexicans living in Glenn Springs were holding a celebration for themselves and the people in the area. Since many people had come to town that day, Alvarez and his men looked like regular citizens, visiting friends and family, and had no trouble occupying the Mexican neighborhood without alerting the soldiers' suspicions. The conflict began sometime after 11:00 P.M., by which time everyone in town had gone to sleep, except the rebels who started the raid by arming themselves and approaching the home of Compton and his three children. One of the rebels knocked on the door and asked if there were any soldiers in town, to which Compton said there wasn't. The rebels left, allowing Compton time to take his daughter to the nearby home of an old Mexican lady, where she would be safe. Compton left his two young sons at home by themselves and while he was going back to his house he heard the raiders begin shooting and calling out "Viva Villa" and "Viva Carranza." Compton apparently hid at that point and by the time he had got back to his home he found that his four-year-old son had been murdered but his ten-year-old boy was left unharmed, likely because he was a deaf-mute.

Meanwhile, the nine-man cavalry squad, under Sergeant Charles E. Smyth, had abandoned their tents and taken up positions in an old adobe building. The skirmish that followed lasted for nearly three hours but eventually the rebels came up with a cunning idea to set fire to the roof, which was thatched with candelilla leaves. This forced the cavalrymen leave the structure and try to retreat to their horses, and it was during this time that three of the soldiers were killed and at least four others were either wounded or severely burned.

The soldiers who were killed were

- William Cohen
- Stephen J. Coloe
- Lawrence K. Rogers

One civilian, a son of C.G. Compton, was also killed.

The surviving soldiers escaped and hid in the desert outside of town. Mr. and Mrs. Ellis watched the attack from a canyon behind their house. They hid there for some time until deciding to walk to the ranch of James Rice, 12 miles away. Capt. Wood was at his ranch three miles from town when he heard the shooting. At first he thought it was celebrating but as the firing continued he decided to mount his horse and ride to town with his friend, Oscar de Montel. It took over two hours before Wood and de Montel made it to town. They arrived just before the cavalrymen retreated, and entered unnoticed. Wood and de Montel then dismounted and began walking to the general store, which was on fire, but 50 yards away they heard the sound of horses eating corn and men speaking Spanish. When de Montel climbed a hill to have a better look someone saw him and called out Quién vive? De Montel responded with Quién es? and then the shooting started. The two men then began running as fast as they could but they hit a wire fence and fell to the ground. A bullet splintered a rock near where Wood had fallen and some of it hit him in the hand, causing a slight wound. Once out of town the two were able to elude their pursuers and make contact with the surviving cavalrymen.

According to author Benjamin R. Beede, the rebels encountered no resistance at Boquillas and they successfully looted the town. Lt. Col. Alvarez was somehow captured by the townspeople, although the raiders took two hostages before heading to the Del Carmen mines to steal the company payroll. The hostages were Jesse Deemer and his black Seminole assistant Monroe Payne, a relative of the Indian scouts Adam and Isaac Payne. According to Beede's account, more hostages were taken at the mines but all of them were apparently released before the rebels rode back to Mexico. After the attack on Glenn Springs, Ramirez regrouped with Alvarez's men in Boquillas and they crossed the Rio Grande into the state of Coahuila. The hostages were held in a stolen truck and driven to Mexico. Deemer pretended he was a German while in captivity; this was because of an order issued by Pancho Villa, who viewed Germans as friendlies. When the raid was over, the commercial buildings and some of the houses in Glenn Springs were heavily damaged but Boquillas was left comparatively untouched. At Glenn Springs, the wax factory, the Ellis' store and the adobe building the American soldiers defended were all burned and several houses were looted. The rebels also stole all of Mrs. Ellis' clothing and a day later some of the thieves were seen wearing the clothes near San Vicente, Texas. In all, four Americans had been killed, two captured and at least five wounded or burned. Though successful, at least one Mexican rebel was killed and a few were wounded. Capt. Wood said that on May 6 he found the body of one raider and "seven pools of blood," indicating that some others may have been either killed or wounded. The army later established a camp at Glenn Springs, which it maintained until 1920, when the settlement became a ghost town.

== Aftermath ==
When Gen. Hugh L. Scott learned of the attack he organized another punitive expedition under the joint command of Col. Frederick W. Sibley and Maj. George T. Langhorne. Setting out from Marathon on May 8, the expedition assembled at Jesse Deemer's store in Boquillas, where Col. Sibley allowed Maj. Langhorne to proceed ahead of the main column with two troops of the 8th Cavalry; the remainder of the expedition would then follow in two days. With 80 men, two wagons and one Cadillac touring car, Langhorne crossed the Rio Grande on May 11 and headed for the village of El Pino, Coahuila, where the rebels were holding Deemer and Monroe Payne. Following a 24-hour march, Langhorne arrived at El Pino and learned that the rebels wanted to trade Lt. Col. Alvarez for Deemer and Payne. Langhorne had no intention of negotiating so he put "12 sharpshooters" into the touring car and ordered them to attack the little village. However, when they began their advance, the rebels fled, leaving Deemer and Payne in American hands. Though the two hostages had been liberated, the Americans continued to search for the raiders and, on May 15, a small force of cavalrymen, under the command of Lt. Stuart W. Cramer, engaged in a "brief firefight" at Castillon. Five Mexicans were killed during the skirmish and two more were wounded; there were no casualties on the American side. The expedition occurred while the U.S. and the Mexican government of Venustiano Carranza were holding a peace conference in El Paso. During the conference, Carranza issued a statement saying that Sibley's and Langhorne's "little punitive expedition" was pushing Mexico and the U.S. into war. Carranza had already protested about Gen. Pershing's expedition in Chihuahua, so it was agreed that Sibley and Langhorne would return to the U.S., which they did, on May 25, after a 550-mile journey.

== See also ==
- Garza Revolution
- Attacks on the United States
