= Battle of Zapote River =

Battle during the Philippine–American War

- Part of the Philippine–American War
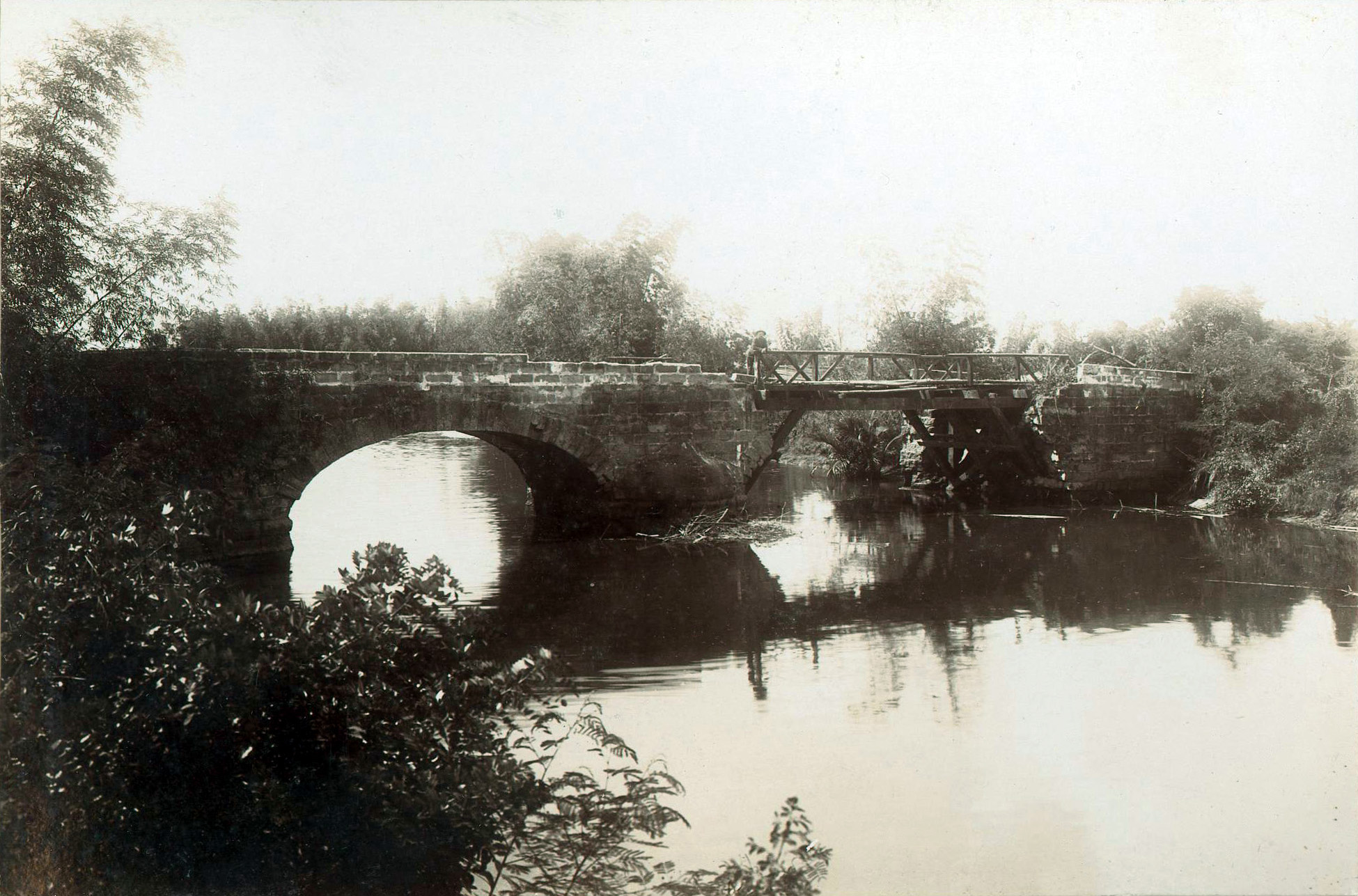
- The reconnected Zapote Bridge in 1899 being guarded by an American soldier after the battle on June 13, 1899. One span of the bridge was removed by the locals, substituted with a wooden span, which was burned down before the fighting.
Date	13 June 1899
Location	Zapote, Bacoor, Province of Cavite and Zapote, Las Piñas, Province of Manila, Philippines 14°27′50.5″N 120°57′58.8″E
Result	American victory

Belligerents
First Philippine Republic	United States

Commanders and leaders
(First Philippine Republic) Artemio Ricarte (First Philippine Republic) Guillermo Masangkay	(United States) Henry W. Lawton

Strength
4,000–5,000; 6 field guns	1,200; 4 field guns 7 gunboats

Casualties and losses
150 killed 375 wounded	14 killed 61 wounded
- Location in the Philippines

The Battle of Zapote River (Filipino: Labanan sa Ilog ng Zapote, Spanish: Batalla de Rio de Zapote), also known as the Battle of Zapote Bridge, was fought on the 13 June 1899 between 1,200 Americans and between 4,000~5,000 Filipinos. It was the second largest battle of the Philippine–American War after the Battle of Manila five months before in February 1899. Zapote River separates the town of Las Piñas in what was then Manila province from Bacoor in the province of Cavite. The ruins of Zapote Bridge still stands next to its replacement bridge on Aguinaldo Highway.

== Zapote Bridge ==
Zapote Bridge was made of masonry, spanning the Zapote River. It connected the towns of Bacoor and Imus to the south and Las Piñas and Manila to the north. It has been witness to two major historical events; the Philippine revolution against Spain in 1897 and the Philippine–American War of 1899.

Half of the original Zapote Bridge was destroyed during the battles; thus, the local government of Las Piñas funded the restoration of the other half of the bridge. The reconstructed bridge became a pedestrian promenade, connecting Barangay Zapote, Las Piñas to Barangay Zapote in Bacoor, Cavite. Monument parks were established on both ends of the bridge – one made by sculptor Eduardo Castrillo in the Las Piñas area and another monument depicting the Battle of Zapote Bridge in Bacoor, Cavite.

In February 1997, Villar Foundation, local governments of Bacoor, Cavite and the City of Las Piñas, the National Centennial Movement, and the Department of Education organized an event to pay tribute to the centennial year of the Battle of Zapote Bridge. A street drama, based on the events of 1896–1897, was reenacted of the Battle of Zapote Bridge.

== Battle ==
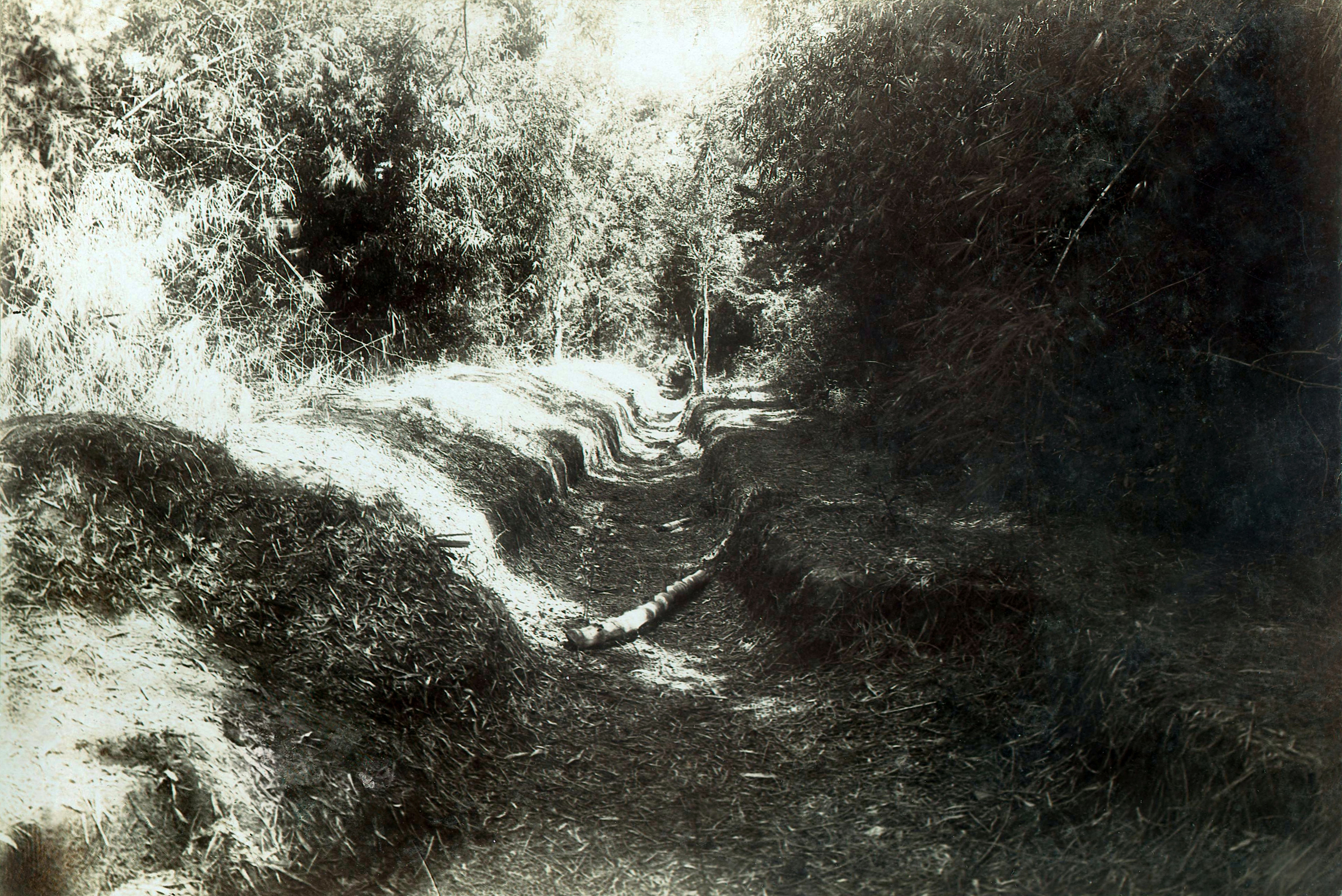
Part of the trenches used by the Filipinos south of the bridge.

The Battle of Zapote River was part of the armed reconnaissance by the U.S. Army between Manila Bay and Laguna de Bay that commenced on June 9 to rid the countryside of Filipino Army rebelling against the Americans. A fleet of gunboats – Callao, Manila and Mosquito – led Admiral George Dewey, were on Manila Bay to provide naval gunfire support. These were soon joined by the Helena, Princeton, Monterey and Monadnock gunboats.

The battle started around 6:15 am after three shots were fired by the Filipinos at the American outpost from a 1-pounder Hotchkiss gun. In retaliation, the Sixth artillery under Lieutenant Benjamin M. Koehler fired back six shrapnel shells from two 3.2-inch (81 mm) guns.

At the portion of the river between the river and Manila Bay, Companies F and I of the 21st Infantry Regiment were scouting the area when they were ambushed by about 1,000 Filipinos after crossing the bamboo pole bridge to Bacoor. Fierce fighting ensued against Filipinos armed with Remington and Mauser rifles. Two of the officers of the two companies were wounded. Later, running low on ammunition, the Americans headed to the beach for safety. They were relieved by a battalion from the Ninth Infantry led by Major Clarence R. Edwards. Major Starr signaled the gunboats for support, which responded with men and ammunition from the Helena and Monadnock.

Near the Zapote Bridge, General Samuel Ovenshine moved his artillery on the road, flanked by his infantry. Upon moving on to the enemy, the fire opened furiously to-and-fro the Filipino trenches and breastworks south of the bridge. Artillery fire were exchanged between a Filipino battery, firing from 6-inch (150 mm) smoothbore cannon and 1-pounder Hotchkiss guns, and Battery D with a 3.2-inch field gun, 3-inch and 1.65-inch Hotchkiss guns. Soon, the battery led by First Lieutenant William L. Kenly moved forward, without cover and under terrific fire, to the bridge ramp about 30 yards (27 m) from the enemy battery, where they successfully took the enemy with precision shots. At this point, the bridge was not fordable as one span had been removed and its wooden replacement had burned down.

The rest of both armies soon joined the fighting which expanded to cover the stretch from the beach to beyond the bridge. Eventually, it became obvious that the greater number of Filipino soldiers had not been a decisive advantage. The American gunboats also shelled the shores in front of the Americans troops, which devastated the Filipino positions.

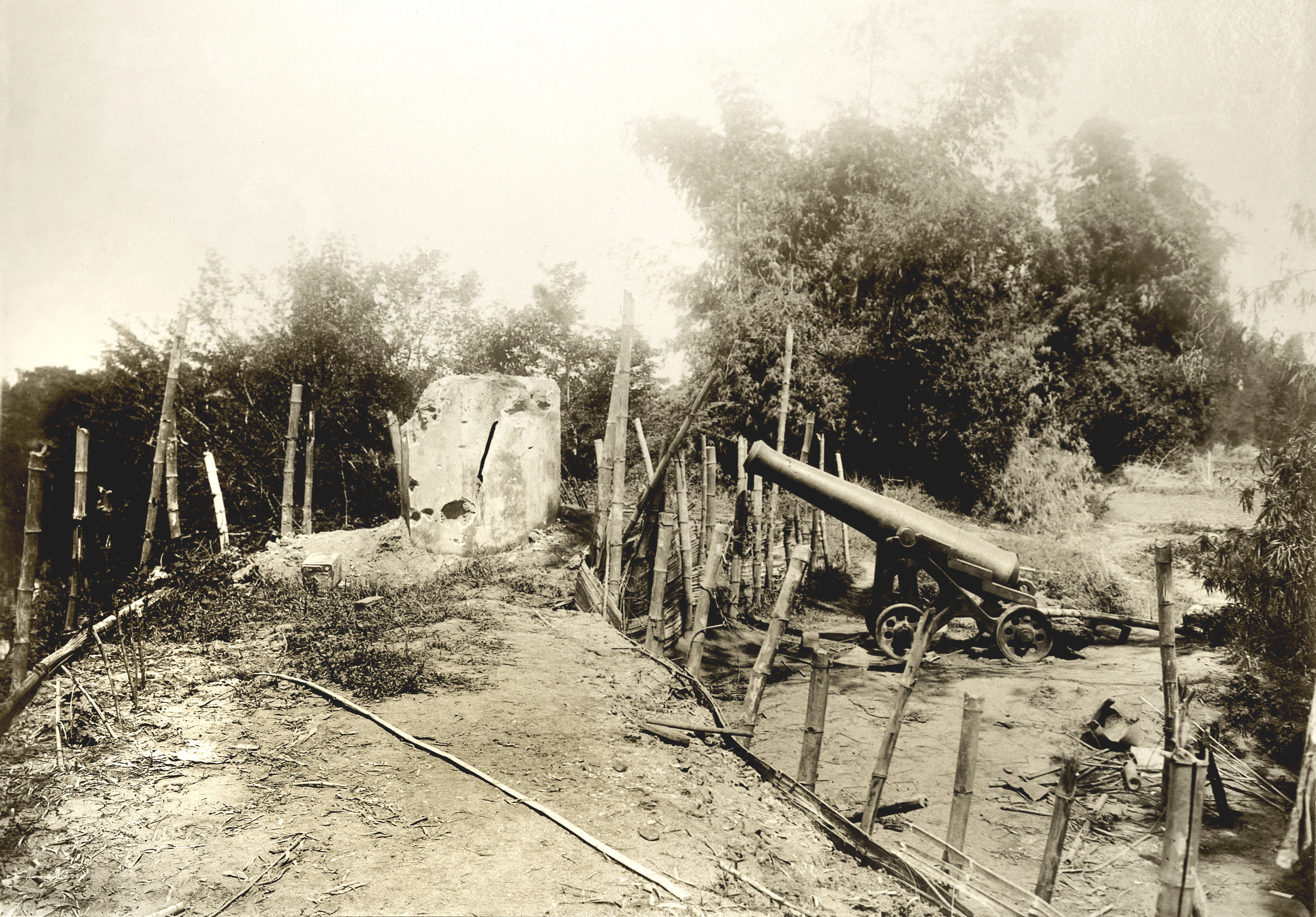
The smoothbore cannon used by the Filipinos and left during their withdrawal

Initially, the army under General Guillermo Masangkay engaged the U.S. forces and gained the advantage. However, inferior arms and a lack ammunition forced the soldiers to retreat. General Guillermo Masangkay was wounded in the skirmish. After hours of heavy fighting, between 4 and 4:40 pm, the Filipinos gave way, abandoning their positions and began falling back. The bridge was temporarily repaired with wooden stringers. Brigadier General Loyd Wheaton and his men began crossing the bridge as ordered by Major General Henry W. Lawton. He sent forward a company from the 21st Infantry headed by First Lieutenant William M. Morrow to ascertain the positions of the enemies and found them 1 mile south of the bridge. After more fighting, they drove the defenders out of their lines who fled towards Imus and San Nicolas, Bacoor. A Filipino rearguard held off the Americans long enough for the main Filipino force to withdraw inland.

== Aftermath ==
Both sides suffered heavily: the Americans suffered 75 casualties with 14 killed and 61 wounded. The Filipinos suffered 150 deaths and 375 wounded.

Captain William H. Sage earned the Medal of Honor for his actions.

Consequently, the Philippine Army began using tactics of guerrilla warfare, avoiding a decisive battle and reverting to harassment.

The bridge was designated as a national historical landmark by the National Historical Commission of the Philippines on September 9, 2013.

== Sources ==
- U.S. War Department (1900-06-30). "Annual Reports of the War Department, Part 3 of 7". Government Printing Office, Washington.
