= Catarino Garza =

Tex-Mexican revolutionary, journalist, and folk hero

Catarino Erasmo Garza
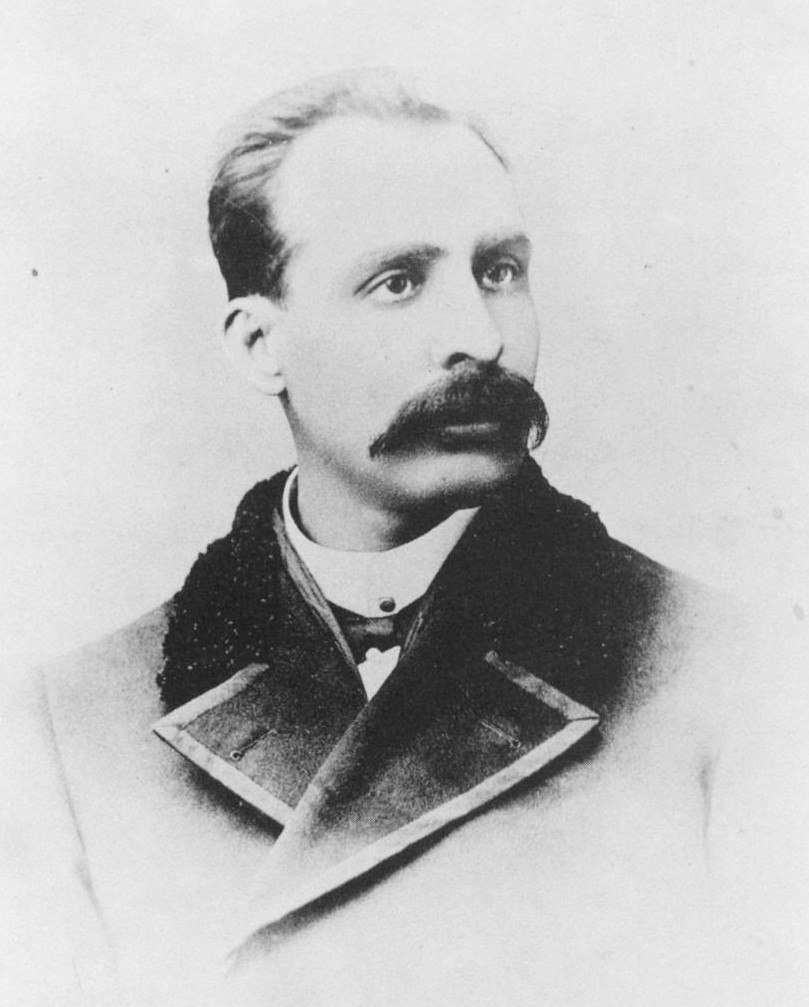
- Born: November 25, 1859; Matamoros, Tamaulipas, Mexico
- Died: March 8, 1895 (aged 35); Bocas Town, Panama
- Occupations: journalist, editor, revolutionary
- Known for: Garza Revolution

Catarino Erasmo Garza (November 25, 1859 – March 8, 1895) was a Mexican journalist, folk hero and revolutionary. He published Spanish language newspapers in the United States, founded mutual aid societies, and is perhaps best known for the unsuccessful Garza Revolution near the Texas Mexican border. Garza was born in Matamoros, Tamaulipas and moved to Brownsville in 1877. After his revolution's failure in Texas, Garza fled to Costa Rica, where he became a police captain. He ended up joining a group of Colombian democracy advocates in their struggle against state proponents. He was killed in Panama in an attack on a military barracks in 1895 at the age of 35.

== Early life ==
Catarino Erasmo Garza Rodríguez was born near Matamoros, Tamaulipas, on November 24, 1859. His parents were J. Encarnación and María de Jesús Rodríguez de la Garza. He attended Colegio San Juan de los Esteros in Matamoros and served in the National Guard. He moved to the U.S. in 1877, where he met and married a white woman named Carolina Connor. Garza lived in various cities, including Brownsville, Laredo, San Antonio, and St. Louis. In Missouri, he was briefly appointed as Mexican consul. He helped found sociedades mutualistas in several American cities.

== Writing ==
In 1887, Garza and Gabriel Botello published El Libre Pensador in Palito Blanco, Texas. The paper was meant to raise awareness to the increasing brutality of the Porfiriato dictatorship and its extension in Coahuila through the governor José María Garza Galán. Garza's newspaper and equipment were confiscated, he was charged with criminal libel, and served 31 days in jail. Garza resumed publication of his critical writing in December 1887 after moving to Corpus Christi, Texas. This writing was extremely vocal in its condemnation of the abuses of the Texas Rangers against Mexican Americans. In 1888, he was arrested by Texas Ranger captain John R. Hughes and charged with libel for his coverage of the murder of Abraham Reséndez by Texas Ranger Victor Sebree. Garza was taken to Rio Grande City where he was shot and wounded by Sebree. The city erupted in violence at the news of Garza's wounding, and the Rio Grande City Riot of 1888 ensued. That year, Garza began writing his autobiography, La Lógica de los Hechos, where he detailed his life in the U.S. and the extreme violence Mexicans and Mexican Americans experienced in Texas.

== Revolution ==
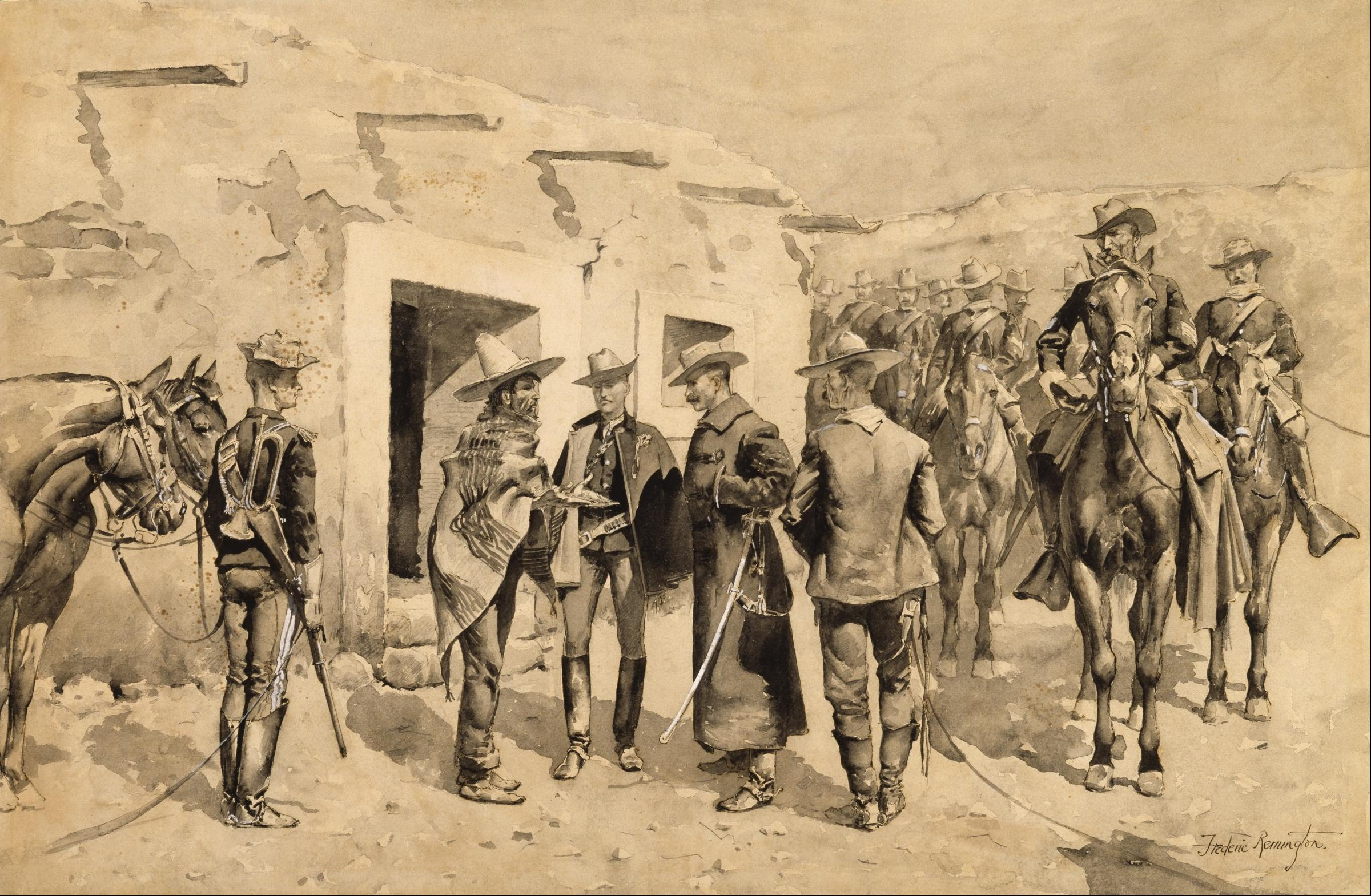
U. S. Cavalry Hunting Garza Men on the Rio Grande (c. 1890–94).

In 1891, Garza and his associates plotted the overthrow of the Porfirio Díaz regime. He recruited a multi-class army consisting of lower-middle-class professionals, poor farmers, landless ranchers, and wealthy landowners, with both Mexicans and Mexican Americans (as well as a few Anglo Americans who had married into Mexican families). The Garzistas adopted the slogan "libres fronterizos" which were stitched onto their hats. The Harrison Administration's military response to the Garza Revolution was extremely bloody, and set precedent for U.S. domestic warfare.

Leading the suppression was U.S. Army captain John Gregory Bourke, who said, "The cheapest thing to do is to shoot them down wherever [they are] found skulking about with arms in their hands, and to burn down some of the ranchos which gave them shelter." Bourke, who had fifteen years experience in Arizona during the Apache Wars, led his armies to destroy all Tejano communities believed to support Garza. The U.S. Army burned down ranches, threatened families with lynching, searched without warrants, and stole guns, horses, and money from Tejano families. Complaints were filed with state and federal officials, but the atrocities were ignored. Garza fled into exile in early 1892, and the revolt was suppressed by 1893, at which point Catarino Garza was in exile in Costa Rica.

== Death ==
After Garza's exile from Texas, he traveled throughout the Western Hemisphere, including New Orleans, Key West, Florida, Nassau, Jamaica, and Havana, Cuba. In March 1893, he moved to Matina, Costa Rica, where he published his last pamphlet denouncing the violence of the Díaz regime, it was entitled La Era de Tuxtepec en México o Sea Rusia en América. Garza then joined a revolutionary uprising in Colombia during the Colombian Civil War of 1895. Official sources describe Garza's death; he was killed while attempting to free prisoners in Bocas Town on March 8, 1895.

== Garza Commission ==
In 2021, Mexican President Andrés Manuel López Obrador created the Garza Commission to investigate the history of Garza and to try to find his remains in Bocas del Toro Province, Panama, and repatriate them to Mexico. López Obrador has long had a fascination with Garza, and he even published a short history in 2016 entitled Catarino Erasmo Garza Rodríguez: ¿Revolucionario o Bandido? The commission spent at least 9.5 million Mexican pesos to find Garza's body. The mission was criticized in Mexico for spending too many resources to recover one nineteenth-century person when more than 100,000 Mexican people were reported disappeared as of 2024. The historian Elliott Young, who wrote a book about Garza's Revolution in 2004, wrote in an article in Time magazine, "Rather than repatriating Garza's bones, López Obrador should resurrect Garza's ideas."
