= Lauro Aguirre =

Lauro Aguirre (1855 – January 9, 1925) was an spiritist engineer and journalist who was active during events that foreshadowed the Mexican Revolution.

== Early life ==
Lauro Aguirre was originally from Batosegachi, Chihuahua. He trained as a civil engineer and spent his early career as a surveyor in Veracruz and Sonora. He married in 1891.

== Journalism ==
By 1892 he had moved to El Paso, Texas, where he published a newspaper entitled El Independiente (The Independent). This drew the attention of United States federal authorities who endeavored to maintain U.S. neutrality in Mexican affairs by monitoring the activities of Mexican rebels who resided north of the international border. In 1895, Aguirre participated in protests against the government of Porfirio Díaz.

On 5 February 1896 Aguirre published a call for rebellion against the government of Mexico. The next month the United States government arrested Aguirre and another journalist, Flores Chapa, because the Mexican consul accused them of conspiring to reenter Mexico and engage in revolutionary actions. Aguirre and Chapa were acquitted in U.S. federal court after the U.S. consul's investigation concluded that they had only engaged in legitimate newspaper publishing.

In July 1896 a conflict arose along the US-Mexican border known as the Yaqui Uprising, which was associated with a popular leader named Teresa Urrea. Mexican government documents from the period connect Lauro Aguirre to Urrea and other revolutionaries. Aguirre worked with Urrea to organize raids against Mexican customs offices.

== Revolutionary activities ==
In 1902 Aguirre wrote to President Theodore Roosevelt to request protection as a political refugee, after having heard a rumor that the Díaz government planned to kidnap him. The previous year, the mayor of Ciudad Juárez had complained to United States authorities about subversive activities by Aguirre associated with his newspaper, which had been renamed El Progresista. The U.S. consul charged with investigating Aguirre's complaint found no evidence of a kidnapping plot.

Afterward Aguirre launched another newspaper, La Reforma Social, and joined the Partido Liberal Mexicano (PLM), which was the most extreme of the anti-Díaz organizations. Aguirre became president of the El Paso PLM branch and organized an attempted takeover of Ciudad Juárez. Their plans failed because Díaz government agents infiltrated the PLM. Enrique C. Creel, the governor of Chihuahua, attempted to get Aguirre extradited in 1906 by framing him for murder and having Mexican officials present forged evidence to American officials. Aguirre was arrested and jailed in the United States for forty days before evidence of his innocence prompted his release.

Aguirre continued to publish about Mexican politics with another newspaper, El Precursor. He retired in 1913.
