= Frank Wheaton =

Military commander

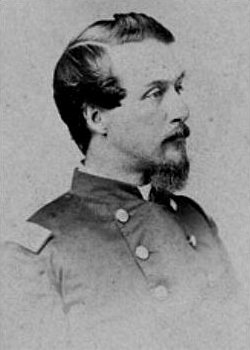
- Born: May 8, 1833; Providence, Rhode Island
- Died: June 18, 1903 (aged 70); Washington, D.C.
- Burial place: Arlington National Cemetery
- Military career
- Allegiance: United States of America: Union (American Civil War)
- Branch: United States Army: Union Army
- Service years: 1855–1897
- Rank: Major General
- Commands: 2nd Rhode Island Infantry; 2nd U.S. Infantry Regiment
- Conflicts: American Civil War; Modoc War; Garza Revolution; Yaqui Uprising

Frank Wheaton (May 8, 1833 – June 18, 1903) was a career military officer in the United States Army during the American Civil War and Indian Wars. He also was military commander over south Texas during the Garza Revolution.

== Early life and career ==
Wheaton was born in Providence, Rhode Island, to Dr. Francis Levison and Amelia S. Wheaton née Burrill. Dr. Francis Levison Wheaton graduated from Brown University in 1828 and served as a surgeon in the Mexican–American War and the American Civil War and as surgeon general of Rhode Island.

Frank Wheaton attended Brown University, studying civil engineering, but withdrew in 1850 at the age of seventeen to take a position with Mexican-American Boundary Commission, where he worked for the next five years. On March 3, 1855, he was commissioned as a first lieutenant in the 1st U.S. Cavalry and assigned to duty on the Indian frontier on the Missouri and Kansas Border. He participated in the campaign against the Cheyenne Indians and also in the Utah War and was promoted to captain on March 1, 1861.

On February 5, 1857, he married Sarah Maria Cooper (August 4, 1836 – December 15, 1858). They had one child, Sarah Maria Cooper Wheaton, in 1858. His wife died shortly thereafter. Wheaton remarried on November 2, 1861, to Emma Twiggs Mason (October 17, 1836 – February 16, 1864), born at Fort Des Moines, Wisconsin Territory, who, like his first wife, was a descendant of George Mason. She died in Harper's Ferry, West Virginia.

== Civil War ==
When the Civil War started, Wheaton was commissioned as lieutenant colonel of the 2nd Rhode Island Infantry on July 10, 1861. His father-in-law from his first marriage, General Samuel Cooper, was the ranking general for the Confederacy, whereas Wheaton fought for the Union. Wheaton's unit fought at the First Battle of Bull Run, where its commander, Col. John Slocum, was killed. Wheaton took command of the unit, was promoted to colonel effective July 21, 1861, and led the 2nd Rhode Island during the Peninsula Campaign, where he was commended for his actions at the Battle of Williamsburg. At the Battle of Antietam, the regiment was kept in the rear and out of the battle.

On November 29, 1862, Wheaton was promoted to brigadier general of volunteers and placed in command of the 3rd Brigade (62d NY, 93d Pa, 98th Pa, 102 Pa & 139 Pa), 3rd Division, VI Corps. He led them in heavy fighting at the Battle of Chancellorsville. His brigade, under the command of Colonel David J. Nevin of the 62nd New York, was the only brigade of the VI Corps to see action on the afternoon of the second day of the Battle of Gettysburg after completing a forced march of approximately 30 miles from Manchester, Maryland that day. At Gettysburg, he commanded the 3rd Division while its commander, Maj. Gen. John Newton, temporarily commanded the I Corps, in place of John F. Reynolds.

Wheaton remained in command of the brigade during Lt. Gen. Ulysses S. Grant's Overland Campaign in 1864, as well as during the subsequent Siege of Petersburg. His men were hurried by train to Washington, D.C., in time to help repel Jubal Early's raid on the capital. During the ensuing operations in the Shenandoah Valley, under Maj. Gen. Philip Sheridan, Wheaton was promoted to command of the first division after Brig. Gen. David Allen Russell was killed at the Third Battle of Winchester. His division fought well in subsequent battles. In the Battle of Sailors Creek Virginia, on April 6, 1865, his division captured Confederate Major General George Washington Custis Lee, son of Robert E. Lee. After the return of VI Corps to the Petersburg front, Wheaton earned the brevet rank of major general in the volunteer army and was brevetted colonel in the regular services.

After the war, Wheaton joined the Military Order of the Loyal Legion of the United States - a military society of officers who had served the Union.

== Postbellum career and life ==
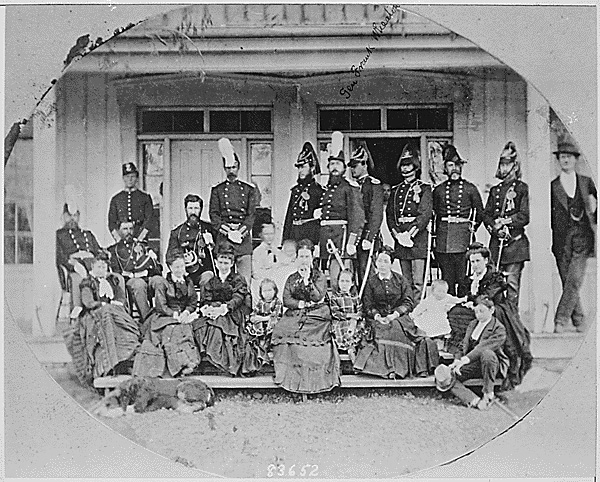
Wheaton, labeled at center, with officers and members of their families, Fort Walla Walla, 1874.

For his service in the Civil War, in 1865 he was awarded an honorary A.M. Degree from Brown University and Rhode Island presented him with a sword of honor in July 1866.

Shortly after the end of the Civil War, Wheaton was placed to command the district of Nebraska in Omaha. On April 30, 1866, he was mustered out of the volunteers and was subsequently promoted as lieutenant colonel of the 39th Infantry on July 28. He was breveted to the rank of major general in the Regular Army, to date from March 13, 1865, for meritorious service during the Civil War.

He, along with others, recommended that Confederate General George H. Steuart of Maryland be pardoned for his crimes during the American Civil War. This led to Steuart's pardon in November 1866.

On January 14, 1867, Wheaton was married for the third and last time to Maria Bleeker Miller (August 4, 1846 – August 21, 1924), born in Utica, New York. She eventually would become a Vice-president General in the Daughters of the American Revolution.

In the lead up to the Modoc War, Wheaton took command of approximately 250 regular army troops and a further 150 troops consisting of volunteers from California and Oregon as well as some Klamath Native Americans. At the First Battle of the Stronghold on January 17, 1873, he faced about fifty Modoc warriors in well-defended positions amongst the lava fields of Northern California in dense fog. Wheaton's troops suffered 35 deaths and many more wounded compared to no casualties on the Modoc side. Wheaton was subsequently relieved of command of the troops in the field. This defeat eventually led to the assassination of General Edward R. S. Canby on April 11 at a meeting of the Peace Commission on the battlefield.

Wheaton was appointed colonel of the 2nd Infantry, effective December 13, 1874. On April 19, 1892, Wheaton was selected in a long and politically heated competition for promotion to brigadier general. While the selection of Wheaton was controversial, it was met with overall approval in the army due to his excellent war record. In August 1896, General Wheaton played a minor role in the Yaqui Uprising at Ambos Nogales. After a group of Yaqui, Pima and Mexican rebels were repulsed in their attempt to capture the customs house in Nogales, Sonora, some of the party fled north into Arizona. Wheaton dispatched two companies of the 24th Infantry to pursue the rebels but they escaped. His district also included troops involved in monitoring and fighting against the Garza Revolution.

In 1896, Wheaton was elected as an Honorary Companion in the Pennsylvania Commandery of the Military Order of Foreign Wars.

After the retirement of Major General Thomas H. Ruger, Wheaton was promoted to major general in the Regular Army on April 3, 1897, and was mandatorily retired one month later on his 64th birthday on May 8.

== Post-military life ==
After his retirement, Wheaton left to spend two years in Europe. He gave a speech at a Thanksgiving dinner in Berlin, Germany in 1898, which he used as a platform to encourage the U.S. Congress to support a stronger military that would reflect the greatness of the United States.

Wheaton died in Washington, D.C., of a brain hemorrhage, and was buried in Section 1, Grave 131-A of Arlington National Cemetery. His third wife, Maria B. Wheaton, was buried next to him in 1924 after she died in Denver, Colorado.

== Legacy ==
The parking lot to the south of the Tomb of the Unknown Soldier in Arlington National Cemetery is named for Wheaton. The Wheaton, Maryland, section of the Wheaton/Glenmont division of the unincorporated township of Silver Spring, Maryland, just northwest of Washington, D.C., is named for him, as is the Wheaton High School, a school in the Down County Consortium of the Montgomery County Public School system of Montgomery County, Maryland.

== See also ==
- List of American Civil War generals (Union)
