= Samuel Ovenshine =

United States Army general (1843–1932)

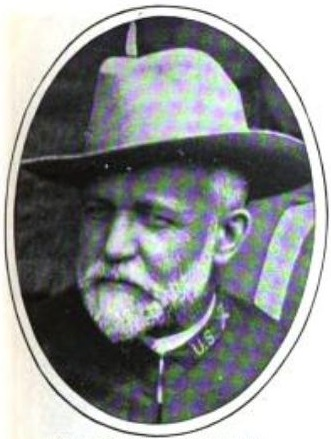
- Ovenshine in 1899
- Born: April 2, 1843; Philadelphia, Pennsylvania, U.S.
- Died: July 5, 1932 (aged 89); Washington D.C., U.S.
- Burial place: Arlington National Cemetery
- Military career
- Allegiance: United States of America; Union
- Branch: United States Army; Union Army
- Service years: 1861–1899
- Rank: Brigadier General
- Commands: 23rd Infantry Regiment
- Conflicts: American Civil War; American Indian Wars; Spanish–American War; Philippine–American War; Battle of Manila; Battle of Zapote River
- Awards: Silver Star

Samuel Ovenshine (April 2, 1843 – July 5, 1932) was a United States Army officer who served as a brigadier general during the Philippine–American War.

== Biography ==
Ovenshine was born on April 2, 1843, in Philadelphia. He was studying to become a lawyer when he was interrupted by the outbreak of the Civil War. On September 25, 1861, he was appointed first lieutenant in the 5th U.S. Infantry Regiment. He served in Kansas and New Mexico and ended the war as a captain.

Ovenshine stayed with the 5th U.S. during the Indian Wars. His unit formed the vanguard of Alfred H. Terry's column during the aftermath of the Battle of Little Bighorn and served in Nelson A. Miles' force at the Battle of Bearpaw Mountain.

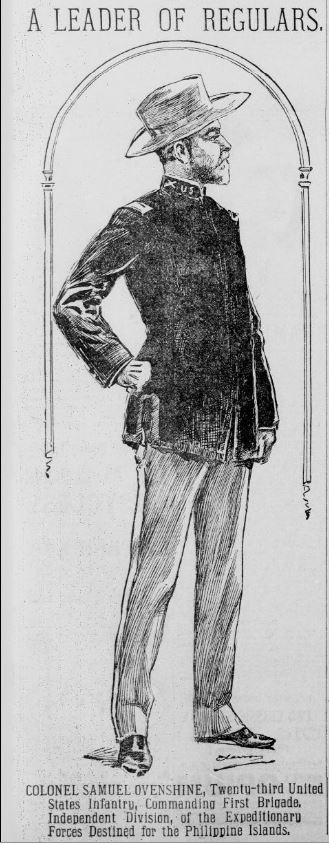
Ovenshine in 1898

Ovenshine was promoted to major in the 23rd United States Infantry on July 10, 1885, and commanded the post of Fort Davis in 1890. He was promoted to lieutenant colonel of the 15th United States Infantry Regiment on January 31, 1891, and colonel of the 23rd United States Infantry Regiment on April 26, 1895.

Colonel Ovenshine and the 23rd U.S. were sent to the Philippines during the Spanish–American War as part of Wesley Merritt's Eighth Army Corps. The fighting against the Spanish had already subsided by the time Ovenshine arrived, but hostilities between the U.S. Army and Filipinos were now growing.

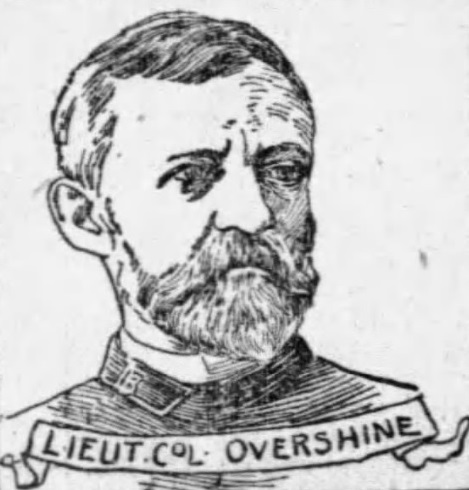
Ovenshine as lieutenant colonel of the 15th Infantry Regiment in 1894

Ovenshine was promoted to brigadier general of volunteers by the end of September 1898 and took command of the 2nd Brigade in Arthur MacArthur's 1st Division of Eighth Corps. Ovenshine led his brigade during the battle of Manila in 1899 and during the battle of Zapote Bridge. He received a Silver Star for his actions in these two battles. On October 18, 1899, he was promoted to brigadier general in the U.S. Army and two days later retired. He died in Washington, D.C., on July 5, 1932, and was buried in Section 1 of Arlington National Cemetery.

== Family ==
In April 1864, Ovenshine married Sallie Yeatman Thompson in Santa Fe, New Mexico. They were the parents of seven children, six of whom lived to adulthood.

- Harriet, the wife of army officer Edwin Babbitt Weeks
- Emma Yeatman, the wife of Lieutenant General James Harbord.
- Samuel Selden, who was born in 1868 and died in 1873
- Englebert Glover, who retired from the army with the rank of colonel
- Alexander Thompson, who retired from the army as a brigadier general
- Mary Aston, the wife of army officer Guy Stevens Norvell
- Sallie Yeatman, a career schoolteacher in the Washington, D.C. area.
