= Teresa Urrea =

Mexican revolutionary (1873–1906)

Teresa Urrea, often referred to as Teresita and also known as Santa Teresa or La Santa de Cábora (the "Saint of Cabora") among the Mayo (October 15, 1873 – January 11, 1906), was a Mexican mystic, folk healer, and revolutionary insurgent.

== Early life ==
Urrea was born in 1873 in Ocoroni, Sinaloa. Her father, Tomás Urrea, was from Álamos, Sonora and owned a "rancho" in Cábora, to the northeast of Álamos. Her mother, Cayetana Chávez, was an indigenous 14-year-old ranch hand from Tehueco. Throughout her early life, which was spent in Cábora and nearby Aquihuiquichi, her father largely ignored her, and she was raised by her bitter aunt and quiet mother.

== Folk icon ==
In the fall of 1889 Urrea had a serious illness and began to experience religious visions. When she recovered she believed she had been given healing powers by the Virgin Mary, and she soon gained a following when 1200 people camped nearby to seek healing and observe miracles. Indigenous people began to call her "The Saint of Cabora". She drew criticism from church officials for giving informal sermons in which she drew attention to clerical abuses. It was reported in the church that she was "always friendly with the sick, especially with the poor, without ever getting angry, demonstrating an exemplary humility. A heroic, she is without rest from dawn until sometimes late at night, and caters patiently and personally with the angry, touching with her hands the most nasty sores, making her bed alongside some patients who suffered from infectious diseases such as phthisis, lazarinos [leprosy], and others." The Mexican press began to cover her activities in December 1889, notably the newspaper El Monitor Republicano of Mexico City.

Urrea predicted an impending flood that would destroy all places except a few she designated. One of the designated places was Jambiobampo, Sonora which was the center of preaching by Damian Quijano, a Mayo inspired by Urrea's teaching whose father had been a general under Cajemé warring against the Mexicans.

Urrea was venerated as a folk saint among the Yaqui and Mayo peoples, who are indigenous to the Sonoran Desert near the United States border. A drought in the states of Chihuahua and Sonora, along with economic and political instability, led the village of Tomochic, Chihuahua to seek her guidance. A violent confrontation occurred there between villagers and government authorities on December 7, 1891. A second village revolt on December 26 routed forty soldiers, and Urrea left the area to avoid being blamed for the incidents. Nonetheless, the government held her responsible and exiled Urrea and her father in May 1892. They settled in Nogales, Arizona. The Tomochitecos, however, continued their armed resistance against the government in her name. In response, government troops razed Tomochic in October 1892, and 300 villagers had died in the struggle by the end of that year. Some modern sources credit Urrea for the religious fervor with which the outnumbered Tomochitecos resisted government forces.

== Expulsion from Mexico ==
Although the resistance fighters invoked Urrea's popular nickname, "Santa de Cabora", and sought her help, there is no direct evidence that she took part in their activities. Her popularity among insurgents appears to have been due to amateur sermons she had made about equality, justice, and brotherly love. Some sources assert that "she also made speeches inciting the people to fight for their land". Her extradition was undertaken as a military action by the Eleventh Regiment and the Twelfth Battalion of the Mexican army under General Abraham Bandala. The Urrea family departed without incident, but General Bandala reported to the Secretary of War that there was a risk of uprisings among the Mayo people due to Urrea's influence. Indigenous Mayos invoked her name when they attacked the city of Navojoa in Sonora in retaliation for the seizure of their lands.

Urrea's arrival in Nogales received a hero's welcome. A crowd greeted her at the train station and local police escorted her to a hotel. Urrea and her father applied for United States citizenship soon afterward, although no record exists that either of them were granted it. Urrea spent the next three years living in a small community near Nogales where she resumed her folk healing.

== Border uprisings ==
By November 1895 she had relocated to Solomonville, Arizona, where Lauro Aguirre and Flores Chapa had recently launched a newspaper El Independiente that was critical of the Porfirio Díaz regime. Aguirre and Chapa opposed the Díaz government practices of dispossessing indigenous people and silencing criticism. In February 1896 Aguirre and Chapa published a circular called Plan Restaurador de Constitucion y Reformista, which referenced the Tomochic rebellion and accused the Mexican government of having violated the 1857 constitution in a variety of ways. The Plan Restaurador called for the violent overthrow of the Díaz government. Twenty-three people signed the Plan Restaurador, some of whom were close to Teresa Urrea, and she was presumed to have been involved behind the scenes. Afterward the United States government tried and acquitted Aguirre and Chapa; Teresa Urrea's alleged involvement drew attention during the trial.

After the trial Teresa Urrea relocated to El Paso, Texas, where Aguirre resumed publishing newspapers. The press in El Paso described her as "an apolitical spiritual healer" until popular revolts against the Díaz government erupted along the border in August 1896. On August 12, seventy indigenous Yaquis, Pimas, and other Mexicans raided the customs house of Nogales, Arizona in the name of "La Santa de Cabora". Three people died during the uprising, which was covered in both the Mexican and American press with implications that the rebellion was inspired by issues of Aguirre's newspaper El Independiente and photographs of Teresa Urrea. Reportedly, insurgents carried her photograph over their hearts in the belief it would protect them during the uprising.

Sources contradict each other regarding the extent of Teresa Urrea's role in the Nogales revolt and in other uprisings that followed. Aguirre's newspaper represented her as an advocate of violent revolution, and published complaints against the Mexican government and clergy with her signature. Yet the El Paso Herald published a statement in which she distanced herself from the uprisings and resented the appropriation of her name for revolutionary purposes. It is uncertain whether the El Paso Herald statement expresses a genuine complaint or an attempt to distance herself from the consequences of actual political activities. The New York Times had attributed 1000 deaths in the border uprisings to her influence. Law enforcement and consular records from the period associate her with revolutionary activities, and the El Paso newspapers reported in January 1897 that the government of Mexico attempted to kill her. Shortly afterward she moved to Arizona.

== Later years ==
Teresa Urrea married in 1900, but the bridegroom acted strangely on the wedding day and may have been involved with the Mexican government in another assassination plot against her. She married a Yaqui miner named Lupe Rodríguez who "brandished a rifle and tried to force Urrea onto a southbound train headed for Mexico". Local press portrayed Rodriguez as mentally unbalanced; the couple separated less than a day after the wedding ceremony.

Shortly afterward Teresa Urrea went to California to treat a boy who had meningitis, and she entered a contract either with a San Francisco publisher or with a pharmaceutical firm to undertake a public tour as a healer. The tour had no lack of audience but encountered internal difficulties related to the language barrier and contractual obligations. Urrea gave a substantial part of her earnings to the poor and before the tour ended Urrea and her translator had become lovers. She bore a daughter in 1902. They settled in Los Angeles, where she openly supported Mexican workers who unionized and went on strike seeking equal pay. In 1904 she relocated to Ventura County, California, had a second child, and purchased a house. She died of tuberculosis in 1906.

Urrea was buried in Clifton, Arizona.

== See also ==
- Yaqui Uprising
- Battle of Mazocoba
