= Brite Ranch raid =

1917 raid of the Mexican Revolution

- Part of the Bandit War, Mexican Revolution
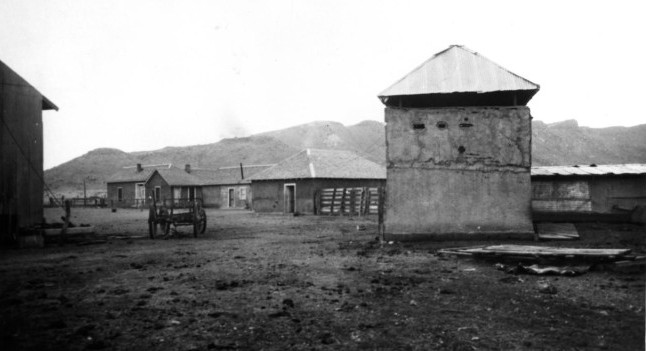
- The fort at Brite Ranch, which was built sometime after the raid in 1918
- Location: 30°19′43″N 104°31′58″W; 18 miles south of Valentine, Presidio County, Texas
- Date: December 25, 1917
- Deaths: 4
- Perpetrators: Villistas, Carrancistas

The Brite Ranch raid was an incident that occurred on Christmas Day 1917, in which Mexican raiders crossed the Rio Grande River border and attacked a ranch in Presidio County, Texas. At the time the raiders were thought to be Villistas, as they had been responsible for several other previous incursions into American territory, though other accounts say that some Carrancistas were involved as well. During the raid the Mexicans murdered three people, robbed a general store and rode back to Chihuahua under pursuit by a motorized posse and troops of the United States Army 8th Cavalry. The Americans fought a running battle with the Mexicans on December 26 that resulted in the deaths of several raiders and the recovery of some stolen property. Soon after, an expedition to find more of the raiders led to another more violent episode when, on January 27, 1918, a force of Texas Rangers accompanied by US Cavalry, executed 15 Mexican men in what became known as the Porvenir Massacre.

== History ==
Brite Ranch had been founded by Lucas Charles "L.C." Brite. It is located in the Big Bend region, between the town of Marfa and the Rio Grande, 15 miles east of the river. At the time of the raid, it was like many other ranches in West Texas—it was as much a small town as a cattle operation.

== Raid ==
Since it was Christmas morning most of the locals were away, except for ranch foreman T.T. "Van" Neill, his family and one or two Mexican-American families. It was just after dawn when the raid began. Van's father, Sam, was the only one awake. He was sitting down drinking coffee when about 45 armed Mexicans galloped into the ranch complex. Sam knew immediately who the Mexicans were, so he ran to his son's room, equipped himself with a rifle, took aim at who he thought was the leader and fired. He killed the man and the others returned fire on the house. By that time Van was awake and joined in the fight. Mrs. Van Neill attempted to alert the sheriff but the raiders had cut the telephone lines. The skirmish lasted for a while before the raiders realized they had little chance of getting into the Neill house without significant losses. They captured a pair of ranch hands, one of whom, José Sánchez, was sent to the house to warn the Neills that if they continued to resist, both he and the other ranch hand would be shot. Van and his father were prepared to continue the fight but Mrs. Neill persuaded her husband to give the Mexicans the keys to L.C. Brite's general store and avoid further confrontation. Van agreed, so instead of trying to break into the house, the raiders spent their time robbing the general store of clothes, food and money. They also gathered up all the best horses at the ranch and took them. While this was going on, the unsuspecting postman, Mickey Welch, arrived at the store in his wagon with two Mexican passengers. The raiders captured all three of the men, shot the two passengers and hung Welch inside the store.

That night the Neills had planned a Christmas dinner party for some of their friends. The raiders had occupied the ranch for several hours when Rev. H.M. Bandy and his family arrived from Marfa to have dinner with the Neills. Van sent a young Mexican boy out to tell the raiders not to shoot them. The raiders let the reverend and his family go to the Neills' house, and when they got out of their wagon Bandy delivered a quick prayer and then armed himself with a rifle to help defend the ranch. According to Ronnie C. Tyler, author of The Big Bend: A History of the Last Texas Frontier, there were other dinner guests already at the ranch but they escaped somehow and went to get help. Rancher James L. Cobb, who lived three miles outside of the ranch complex, heard the gunfire and drove towards the sound to investigate the situation. He stopped a short distance away from the ranch and saw the Mexicans robbing the store. He then drove 12 miles to the nearest telephone and called Lucas Brite, who was at his home in Marfa. Brite informed the local sheriff and went even further by alerting the 8th Cavalry, which was stationed in the area. Shortly thereafter a large posse and some cavalrymen assembled in vehicles to drive to Brite Ranch. They almost caught up with the raiders but the Mexicans quickly mounted up and rode south across the Candelaria Rim, where the Americans vehicles could not follow.

== Aftermath ==
On the next day Col. George Langhorne launched a punitive expedition into Mexico with the intention of capturing or killing the raiders and returning stolen property. Langhorne borrowed some horses from the ranchers for his men, who arrived in vehicles, and after joining up with reinforcements from Ruidosa the expedition crossed the Rio Grande into Chihuahua at a ford called Los Fresnos. Altogether the expedition included two troops of 8th Cavalry, approximately 200 soldiers, and several men from the posse. Langhorne caught up with 29 raiders just across the Rio Grande in San Bernardino Canyon, near Pilares. During the running battle that followed the cavalrymen killed ten of the Mexicans and recovered some of the stolen property, including several horses, most of which had to be shot because they had been ridden too hard and would not survive the return to the ranch. Only one soldier was wounded. Meanwhile, the citizens in the Big Bend region were outraged about the raid and the murders of Mickey Welch and his passengers on Christmas Day. Some citizens formed a committee to disarm and keep watch on the Mexican population in the area but the Texas Ranger company of Capt. Monroe Fox went even further. At around midnight on January 27, 1918, a force of rangers and 8th Cavalry soldiers surrounded the village of Porvenir, located on the Rio Grande across the border from a Mexican village. A search of the town then commenced and while the soldiers were looking through houses, the rangers gathered up 15 men and took them to a nearby hill where they were executed.

The Porvenir Massacre was investigated in 1919, during a state hearing investigating misconduct among the Texas Rangers, but nobody was charged for the crime. The grand jury of Presidio took no action for the killings. However, on June 4, 1918, Governor William P. Hobby disbanded Company B of the Texas Rangers and dismissed five rangers for their actions. After the raid and the subsequent punitive expedition, Lucas Brite built a small fort to house Texas Rangers and protect the ranch but it was never needed.

== See also ==
- Garza Revolution
