= Battle of Nogales (1913) =

Incident during the Mexican Revolution

First Battle of Nogales
- Part of the Mexican Revolution
Date	March 13, 1913
Location	Nogales, Sonora, Mexico
Result	Constitutionalist victory

Belligerents
Constitutionalists: Constitutional Army	Government: Federal Army

Commanders and leaders
Álvaro Obregón	Emilio Kosterlitzky (POW)

Strength
~2,000	~400

Casualties and losses
6 killed 9 wounded	4 killed 5 wounded

The First Battle of Nogales was a military confrontation between Mexican federal forces and rebel Constitutionalists during the Mexican Revolution.

The battle was fought at the border city of Nogales, Sonora, on March 13, 1913. Rebel forces under General Álvaro Obregón attacked the federal garrison of about 400 infantry. Obregón's army included infantry, cavalry and at least one artillery piece. Fighting lasted for a few hours before the federal commander, Colonel Emilio Kosterlitzky, was captured. The remaining federal troops retreated across the border and surrendered to the United States Army garrison of Nogales, Arizona. Captain Cornelius C. Smith relieved the federals of their weapons and they eventually found their way back to Mexico. Six rebels were killed in action and nine were wounded. The federals lost four men killed and five wounded, and Nogales, Sonora, fell to the Constitutionalists.

== See also ==
- Pancho Villa Expedition
