= Garza Revolution =

Armed conflict (1891–1893)

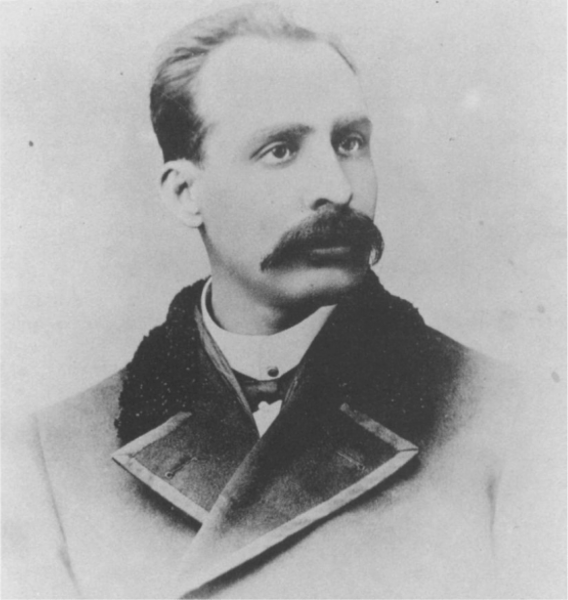
- Catarino Erasmo Garza, the leader of the Garza Revolution.
Date	September 15, 1891 – March 1893
Location	Coahuila (Mexico); Texas (United States)
Result	Joint Mexico / U.S. victory; Garzista rebellion suppressed

Belligerents
Mexico; United States	Garzistas

Commanders and leaders
Porfirio Díaz; Frank Wheaton	Catarino Garza; Francisco Benavides

The Garza Revolution, or the Garza War, was an armed conflict fought in the Mexican state of Coahuila and the American state of Texas between 1891 and 1893. It began when the revolutionary Catarino Garza launched a campaign into Mexico from Texas to start an uprising against the dictator Porfirio Díaz. Because of this violation of neutrality, the United States Army became involved and assisted the Mexican Army in tracking down Garza's followers. The war was relatively minor compared to other similar conflicts in Mexican history though it has been seen as a precursor to the major Mexican Revolution from 1910 to 1920.

== War ==
=== 1891 ===
The Garza Revolution was one of many outbreaks of rebellion during the four decades of Porfirio Diaz' regime. In September, Garza issued a statement, declaring that the citizens of Mexico were "treated like 'despicable slaves,' that the Mexican government was plagued by 'frightful corruption,' that freedom of the press had been squashed, and that the Constitution of 1857 had been betrayed." Garza called on Mexicans to "rise in mass in the name of liberty, the constitution and the public conscience." The war began on the night of September 15 when 60 to 80 Garzistas, as they were called, crossed the Rio Grande near Fort Ringgold, Texas to "overthrow the Mexican government." Many of the Garzistas were Mexican-Americans, recruited in Texas, known for being criminals before the war which is why they are often referred to as bandits or outlaws. A record of the war was created by American military and civil personnel in letters, telegrams and official reports, much of which has been preserved in a collection by the United States Army. On September 16, Captain E. L. Randall, United States Army, sent a telegram from Fort Ringgold to the army's Department of Texas with news of the event; "I have received information that at six o'clock last night C. E. Garcia [Catarino Garza] crossed into Mexico when 14 miles below here with over 50 armed men, his object to attempt a revolution." Guerilla warfare was a major factor in the conflict as the number of Garzistas remained very small and they blended into the civilian population. They never stayed in Mexican territory for more than a few days and they used horses to ride back and forth across the border, almost with impunity. Over the course of two campaigns in three years, the Mexican military and the American army engaged in several small skirmishes, all of them occurring within the vicinity of the Rio Grande Valley. The majority of the fighting was between Mexican troops and the rebels in Coahuila but there were also a few encounters between the Americans and the rebels on Texas soil.

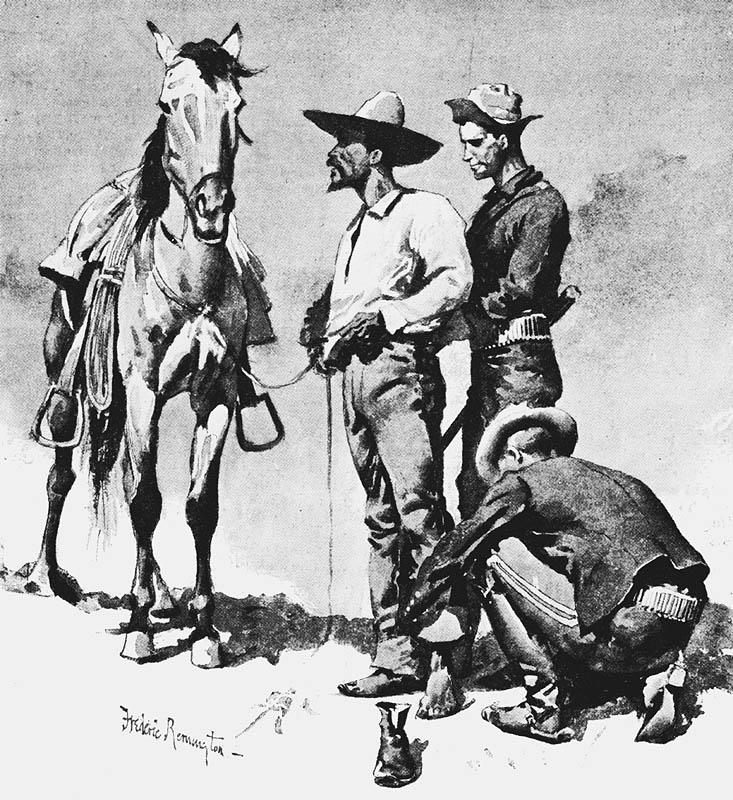
A caricature by Frederic Remington, captioned "Third Cavalry Troopers Searching a Suspected Revolutionist."

The main authors of the correspondence were Captain John G. Bourke, 3rd Cavalry, Captain George F. Chase, 3rd Cavalry, Captain George King Hunter, 3rd Cavalry, Captain E. L. Randall, Fort Ringgold, the United States consul at Matamoros, John B. Richardson, Captain F. H. Hardie, 3rd Cavalry, Stephen O’Connor, 23rd Infantry, M. Romero of the Mexican legation in Washington, D.C., and P. Ornelas, the Mexican consul at San Antonio, Texas. Captain Bourke's reports of the two campaigns are very descriptive, one of the first was written on October 6, 1891, less than a month after the operation's beginning. In it he describes the difficulties of his mission; "The difficulty of the task performed may be inferred from the fact, which is of course well known to the Department Commander, that the population in this valley [Rio Grande Valley] is essentially Mexican—the language, dress, customs, weights and measures, money used—everything about them—may be put down as Spanish, therefore, it is almost an impossibility to separate a 'revolutionist' from one of the ordinary inhabitants." On October 12, Bourke reported the following about the examination of a Mexican village during one of his scouting expeditions; "Every house in a suspected locality is examined, names of inmates taken down, number of horses on hand ascertained, and the vicinity examined for fresh horse or wagon tracks, manure, fires, signs of bedding, anything to suggest the recent presence of strangers" On November 15, Bourke wrote that the expeditions from Fort Ringgold were "without the slightest result, beyond wearing out horses, men, and officers." This was largely due to the fact that the Americans had to search for a small group of locals in sparsely populated wilderness stretching hundreds of miles.

Intelligence gathering was poor; Mexican civilians employed as guides were known for being unreliable because of their sympathies with the rebels, as were local peasants the army encountered. The Mexican Army suffered from the same problems as the Americans, leading Bourke to recommend to his superiors that all field commanders speak Spanish so as to better communicate with Mexican authorities and citizens, rather than rely on the guides. The United States Army also employed 35 Black Seminole Scouts, from Fort Clark, Texas Rangers and local sheriffs to help track the Garzistas. One of the first battles was fought along the banks of the Rio Grande at San Ygnacio, on December 26, during which a large force of rebels opened fire from the Texas side of the river onto Mexican troops on the other side. The engagement was a long range one and according to an American newspaper correspondent, one Mexican soldier was killed and several people were wounded on both sides.

=== 1892 ===
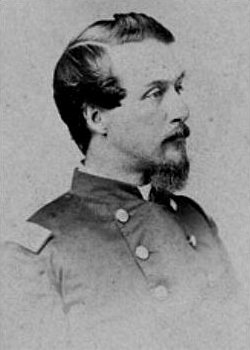
Major General Frank Wheaton

The first campaign occurred between September 1891 and April 1892, by the end of which the Mexican and American militaries were successful in suppressing the rebellion and forcing Garza into hiding in Texas. On January 19, Captain George F. Chase confirmed the weakness of the Garzista forces when he reported the capture of Frank Garza, a relative of Catarino Garza. Frank Garza told Chase that he had served with the rebels for about a month but abandoned them because he was "poorly fed" and "paid nothing." Frank also said that "very few men remained with Catarino Garza." The first engagement involving the Americans was just over a week later, on January 31, when three men from the 3rd Cavalry came across a group of rebels. During the ensuing gunfight, one American, mentioned in records only as Glover, was killed and the two others were able to escape. Captain Chase wrote on February 3 that the men were ambushed at a canyon shaped like a cul-de-sac, adding; "it was a terrible place, it is a wonder that any of them got away." About the same time, the Americans learned that, because of their patrolling and the capture of several key leaders, the rebels had broken up into small groups of between two and 10 men. The closest the 3rd Cavalry came to catching Garza came on February 18, 1892, when Captain Chase was searching the home of Garza's father-in-law, Alejandro Gonzales. According to a letter from Captain Bourke dated March 2, 1892, Chase found what he thought to be Garza's shoeprint leading away from Gonzales' house, but heavy rains helped the rebel escape. Fighting did not resume until December, but Garza was no longer leading the rebels. Instead, they were led by the rancher Francisco Benavides.

In November 1892, Benavides signed and issued a proclamation to the people along the international border. The proclamation read in part; "We have appealed to reason and he [Porfirio Diaz] has not listened to us; we have appealed to patriotism and he has despised us; let us, therefore, rush to the last recourse which remains to us. Our end is noble, since it contemplates the restoration of our liberty besmirched and defiled by the tyrants of Tuxtepec. Let us leave the plough to grasp in hand the sword and, guided by love of our Fatherland, let us re-conquer upon the field of battle the rights which have been usurped from us under the specious pretext of consolidating that abominable peace which has shed so much blood…. Forward, Mexicans! Let us march to die for liberty. Immortal glory for those who know how to die for her! Scorn and degradation for those who prefer to be slaves rather than patriots!"

On December 10, Benavides led 131 mounted rebels in a surprise attack on the village of San Ygnacio, Coahuila, opposite of San Ygnacio, Texas. The engagement lasted from 12:00 am to 3:00 pm and proved to be the deadliest of the war as it turned from a battle into a massacre. The commander of American forces, Brigadier General Frank Wheaton, wrote the following in his annual report of military affairs in Texas; "[At] about 11 a. m. on the 10th of December, 1892, one hundred and thirty-one bandits [rebels] attacked the troop of the Sixth Mexican Cavalry, under Capt. [Rutillio] Segura, stationed on the river opposite that point. The soldiers [40 men and three officers] were at stables, and were unprepared. Ten men and two officers were killed, and twelve wounded; eleven escaped. The quarters were set on fire and the captain and several soldiers who had been wounded were thrown into the burning buildings by the bandits and burned to death. Of the surviving Mexican soldiers twenty-two, with the women and children, were driven to this side. The wounded were cared for by the citizens of San Ygnacio, Tex. It was claimed by Mexican authorities that these Mexican soldiers were detained there against their will as prisoners, but the matter was repeatedly investigated by officers at the time and such was found not to be the case. Most of these soldiers returned to their own country within a few days."

Shortly after learning of the attack, General Wheaton ordered troops of the 3rd Cavalry to ride to the country opposite of San Ygnacio, Coahuila, and begin searching for the rebels. Beginning on December 19, Wheaton ordered additional forces to occupy the Mexican National Railroad and other locations in the immediate area. Elements of the 7th Cavalry, the 18th Infantry and the 23rd Infantry also took up positions along the Rio Grande to prevent any "armed bodies" from crossing the international border. On December 24, Lieutenant P.W. West, with a troop of 3rd Cavalry and the Black Seminole Scouts, discovered a trail near San Ygnacio and followed it. At the end of the trail, West found about 35 rebels who "made a short stand," but fled soon after the Americans returned fire. One of the Garzistas was killed and a second rebel was wounded. Lieutenant West "captured a number of papers and saddles, and burned or destroyed the provisions, etc., that the bandits [rebels] left behind." On December 29, two United States Marshals were captured at Lopeno by 40 to 50 Garzistas who rescued one of their imprisoned leaders, named Antonio Palacios. The two marshals escaped though when the Mexican Army found the rebels and engaged them. A letter dated January 2, 1893, from Deputy Marshal Eugene Iglesias to Marshal Rosendo Guerra, reads; "On the afternoon of the 29th, they numbering some 40 to 50 men, moved down the river to Lopena [Lopeno], some 18 miles below Carrizo; arriving at Lopena about 8 o'clock pm. Some 3 or 4 men came up and informed the captain that they had not noticed any Mexican troops over the river. They went to the river that night, it was a bright moonlight night, the two deputies were placed behind the 10 first men and followed by the remainder of crowd, they began crossing the river when about some 10 or 15 yds from Mexican bank they were fired upon and a general fight began between the bandits [rebels] as they were in the river and the Mexican troops."

=== 1893 ===
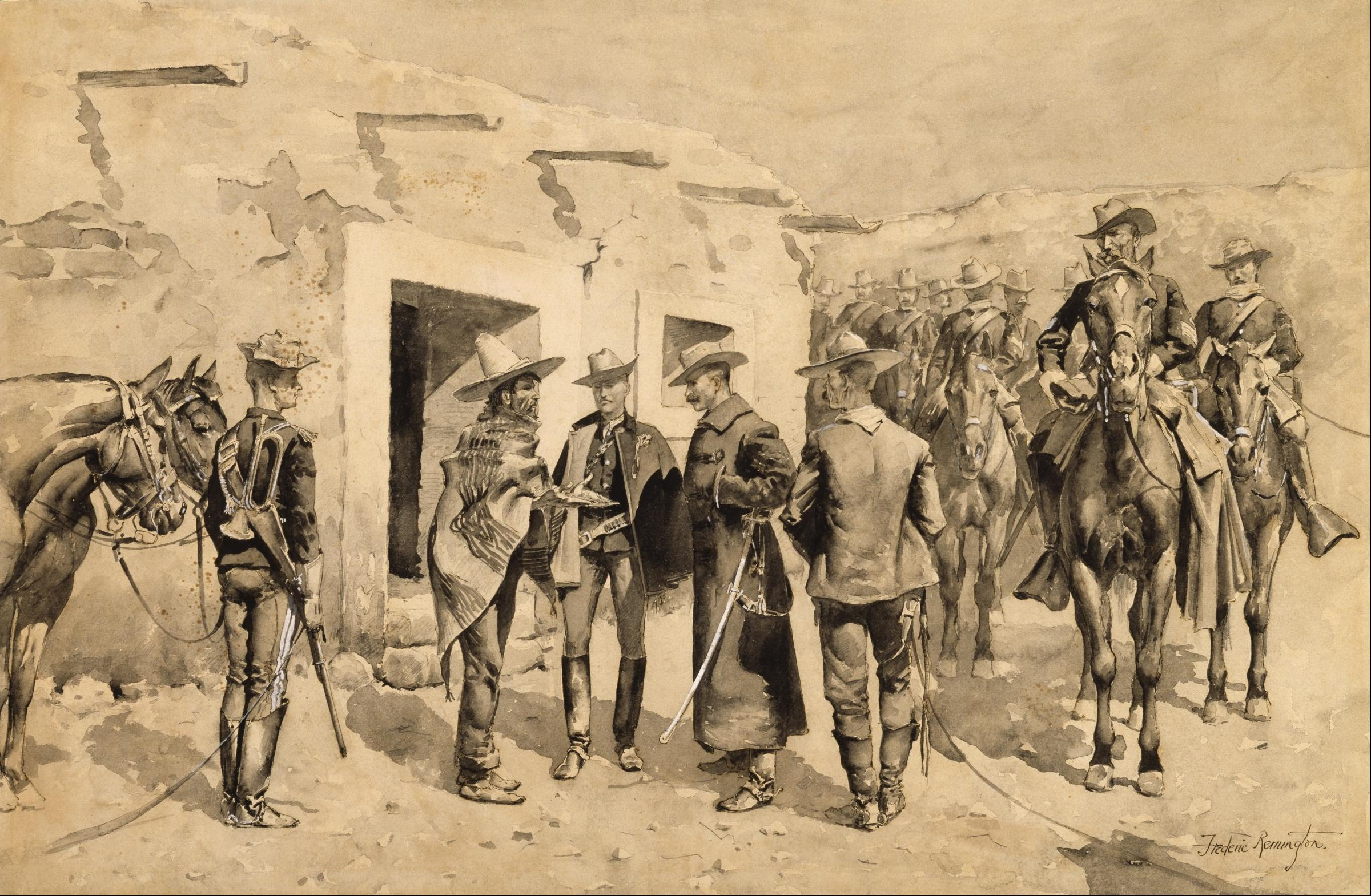
Frederic Remington, U. S. Cavalry Hunting Garza Men on the Rio Grande (c. 1890-94), watercolor on paper, 51.4 x 78.1 cm., Museum of Fine Arts, Houston Google Art Project

Benavides was one of the first prisoners taken by the Americans during the second campaign. On January 21, 1893, a squad from the 3rd Cavalry, under Lieutenant J. T. Dickman, arrested Benavides and another leader named Prudencio Gonzales without a fight on the Mexican side of the border. A day later, Lieutenant Dickman came across Cecilio Eschevarria who put up a "sharp fight" but was ultimately captured. On the same day, a rebel named Maximo Martinez, who participated in the San Ygnacio raid, surrendered to a local sheriff. The final engagement of the war to involve the Americans occurred on February 23 in Starr County. According to General Wheaton, Lieutenant P. G. Lowe, 18th Infantry, was out scouting with a former sheriff named Washington Shely and two Black Seminoles when they came across Las Muias Ranch, held by "the most desperate of all the bandits", Eusabio Martinez, alias Mangas de Agua. Another skirmish ensued and ended with Martinez dead. By March 1893, the war was basically over. Captain Henry Jackson, 7th Cavalry, wrote; "The idea of any Revolution against Mexico is gone, but there are some 50 or 60 still out who are implicated in the San Ignacio raid, without money or food and who, on account of this extradition business, and in some cases civil processes, are afraid to surrender; these men are in the brush, roaming from place to place, stopping no 2 days at any one and will simply have to be hunted down. This can be done better I think by a few Seminoles and the Shelys with his deputies than any other way.... Since my last letter Rafael Nielo and Esperantis Ortiz have surrendered here and others are expected today."

The United States Army continued making arrests of suspected rebels from April to August, but after September, the scouting operations had ceased. General Wheaton reported the capture of 132 individuals during the second campaign, 86 of whom were found to have participated in the massacre at San Ygnacio and 71 of them were convicted in an American court. Wheaton said; "I regret that under our laws more severe punishment can not be given the leaders of such an unlawful raid and brutal massacre as that of December 10 last. Possibly after they have served the sentences awarded by our courts the extradition by Mexico of those guilty of murder and similar crimes may be effected."

== See also ==
- Yaqui Uprising
- Mexican Border War
- Bandit War
- List of wars involving Mexico
