= Nogales =

Nogales (Spanish for "walnut trees") may refer to:

== People ==
- Nogales (surname), includes a list of notable people with the surname

== Places ==
=== Chile ===
- Nogales, Chile

=== Mexico ===
- Nogales, Durango, Coneto de Comonfort Municipality
- Nogales, Sonora, the seat of Nogales Municipality
  - Nogales Municipality, Sonora, adjacent to Nogales, Arizona, U.S
- Nogales, Veracruz, the seat of Nogales Municipality
  - Nogales Municipality, Veracruz

=== Spain ===
- Nogales, Badajoz, a municipality in the province of Badajoz, Extremadura

=== United States ===
- Nogales, Arizona, adjacent to Nogales Municipality, Sonora, Mexico
- Los Nogales, a historic home in Seguin, Texas

== See also ==
- Ambos Nogales, Spanish for "both Nogales"
- Battle of Nogales (disambiguation)
- Nogales High School (disambiguation)
- Nogales International Airport (disambiguation)
