= Battle of Ambos Nogales =

1918 battle of the Mexican Border War

- Part of the Mexican Revolution, World War I, Border War
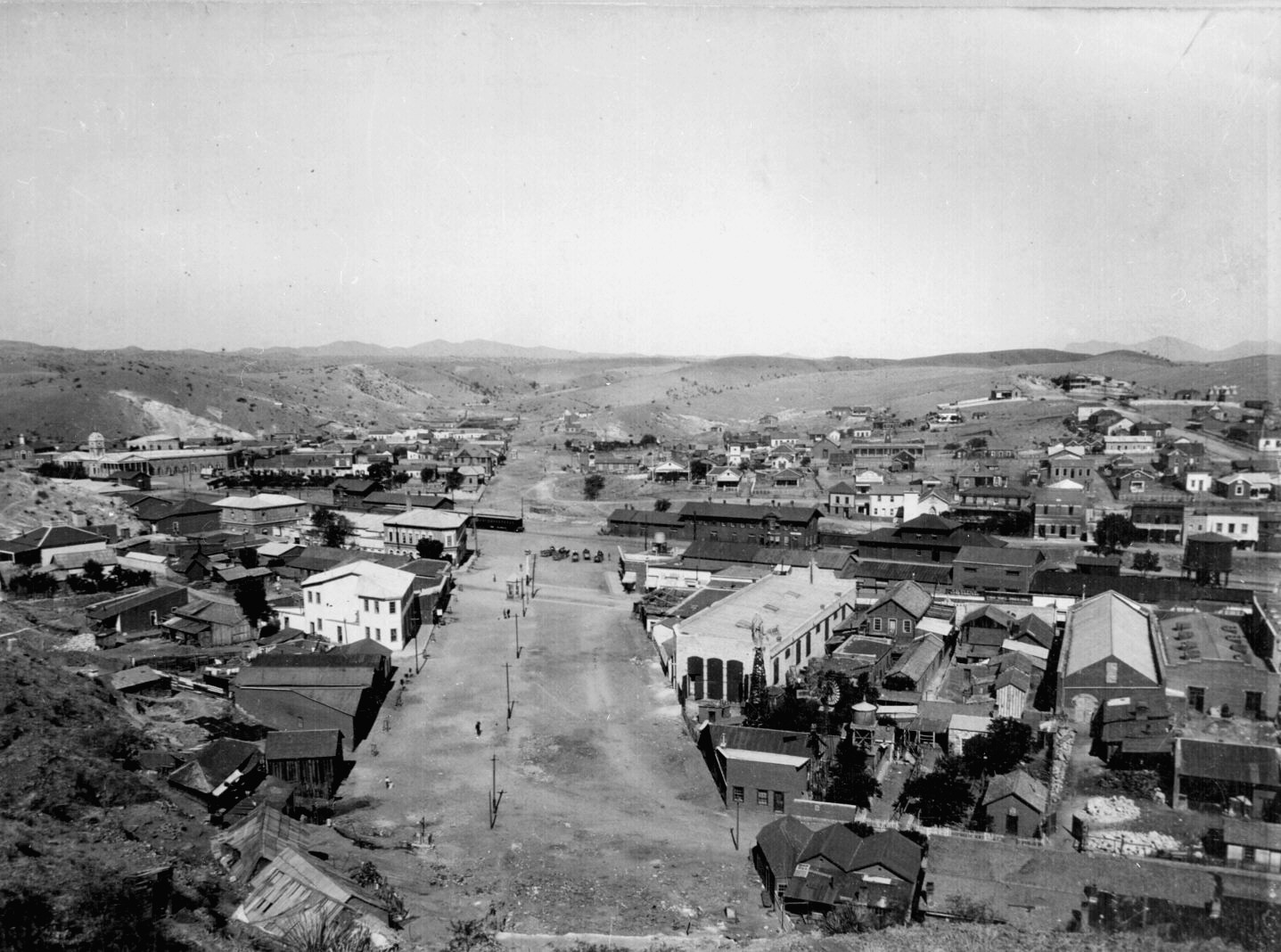
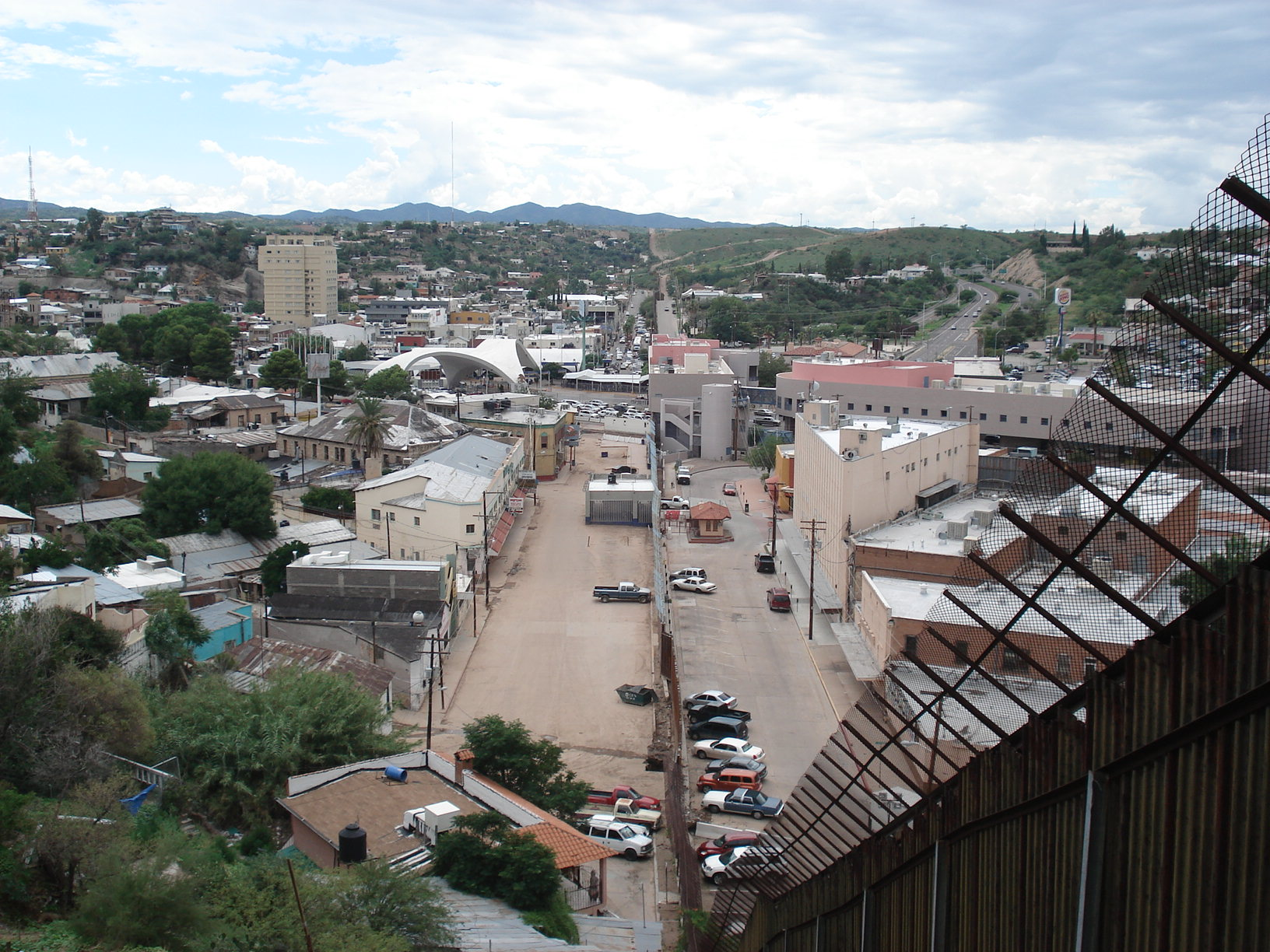
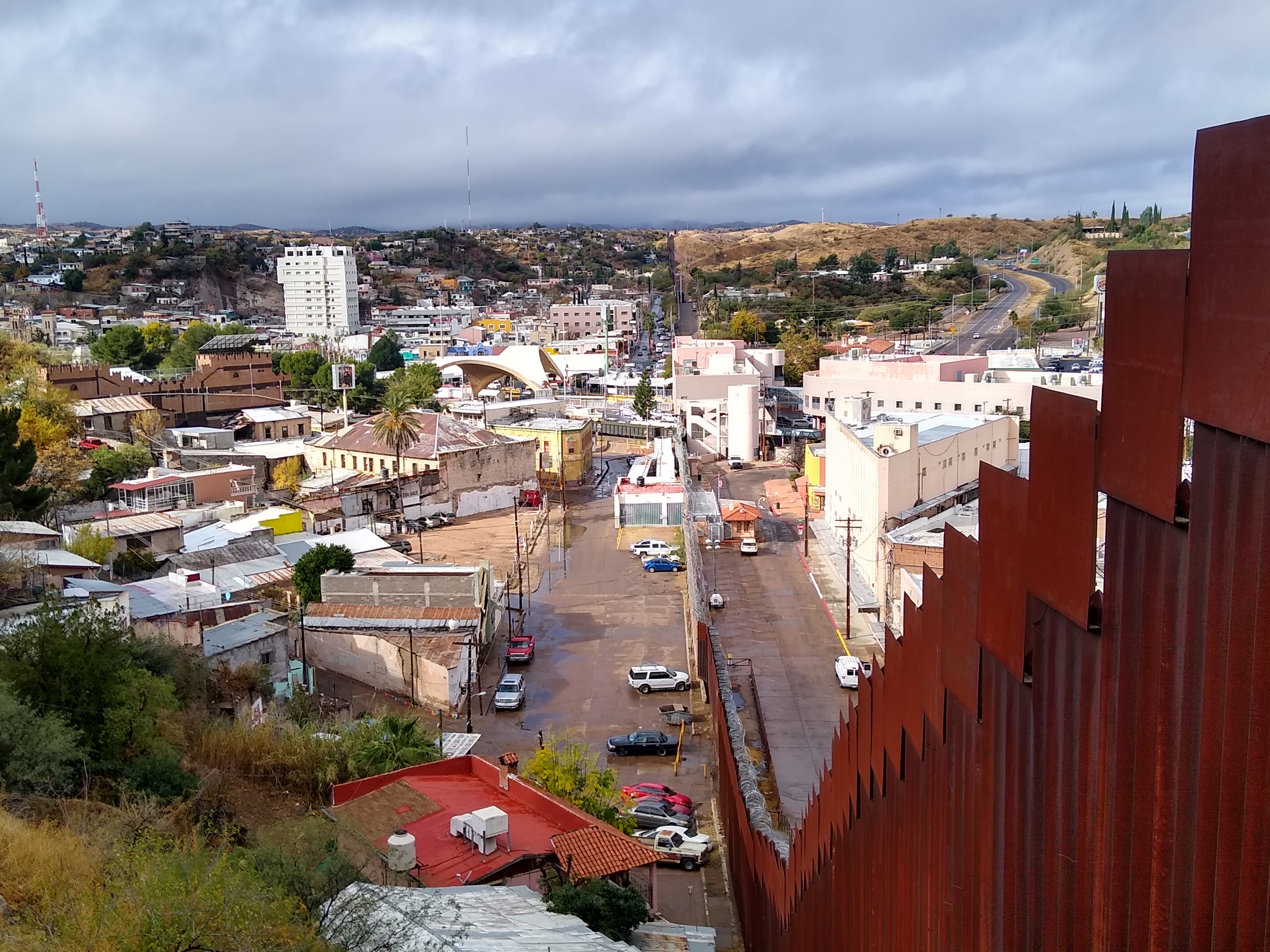
- The U.S.-Mexico border in Nogales in 1898, 2008 (pre-2011 wall), and 2021. International Street/Calle Internacional runs through the center of the image between Nogales, Sonora (left), and Nogales, Arizona (right). Note border posts without fence and rail line in 1898. Customs Post where the first shooting occurred is in center of image this side of rail line. Click on image to enlarge.
| Date | 27 August 1918 |
| Location | Nogales, Arizona, United States; Nogales, Sonora, Mexico 31.3328°N 110.942224°W |
| Result | Ceasefire Agreed: Binational cease-fire arranged; Permanent border wall established in Ambos Nogales; American Invasion of Nogales Repulsed by the Mexicans |

Belligerents
| United States | Mexico; Alleged: Germany |

Commanders and leaders
| (United States) Frederick Herman | Unknown |

Strength
| ~1500 | Unknown |

Casualties and losses
| 15 soldiers, 2 civilians killed 28 soldiers, several civilians wounded | Mexico: (Mexico claims 30 casualties) USA Up to 28-30 soldiers, about 100 civilians killed; 129 new graves were counted About 300 total wounded Alleged: 2 German soldiers killed |
- Location on Arizona/Sonora border Location on United States/Mexico border

The Battle of Ambos Nogales (The Battle of Both Nogales), or as it is known in Mexico La batalla del 27 de agosto (The Battle of 27 August), was an engagement fought on 27 August 1918 between Mexican military and civilian militia forces and elements of U.S. Army troops of the 35th Infantry Regiment, who were reinforced by the Buffalo Soldiers of the 10th Cavalry Regiment, and commanded by Lt. Col. Frederick J. Herman. The American soldiers and militia forces were stationed in Nogales, Arizona, and the Mexican soldiers and armed Mexican militia were in Nogales, Sonora. This battle was notable for being a significant confrontation between U.S. and Mexican forces during the Border War, which took place in the context of the Mexican Revolution and the First World War.

Prior to the late 1910s, the international border between the two Nogaleses was a wide-open boulevard named International Street, but during the course of the decade the violence associated with the Mexican Revolution and growing hysteria related to World War I brought stricter U.S. control of the border. Anti-foreign sentiment grew in the border region with the publicizing of the German Empire's Zimmermann telegram in February 1917. (Some U.S. military historians of the 10th Cavalry and 25th Infantry later claimed German military advisors encouraged Mexican rebels under General Francisco "Pancho" Villa to fight against the U.S. in Nogales.) Related to the World War I anti-foreign sentiment, the shooting deaths of Mexican nationals at the border by U.S. soldiers in Nogales in early 1918 increased racial tensions in the two border towns. As a result of the 27 August battle, the U.S. and Mexico agreed to divide the two border communities with a chain-link border fence, the first of many permanent incarnations of the U.S.–Mexico border wall between the two cities along the two countries' border.

== Background ==
=== U.S.–Mexico relations in Ambos Nogales during the Mexican Revolution ===
The outbreak of the Mexican Revolution in 1910 against the long-time rule of President Porfirio Díaz initiated a decade-long period of high-intensity military conflict along the U.S.–Mexico border, as different political/military factions in Mexico fought for power. The access to arms and customs duties from Mexican communities along the U.S.-Mexico border made towns such as Nogales, Sonora, important strategic assets. The capture of the key border city of Ciudad Juárez in 1911 by Mexican revolutionaries led by Francisco I. Madero (and his military commanders Francisco "Pancho" Villa and Pascual Orozco) led to the downfall of President Diaz and the elevation of Madero to president. The violent aftermath of Madero's assassination during a coup in 1913 again highlighted the importance of the U.S.-Mexico border, as battles for control of Mexican Nogales between Villistas and Carrancistas (forces of Gen. Venustiano Carranza, a former Villa ally) led to American involvement because of cross-border firing into the U.S.. This took place during the Battle of Nogales (1913) and again during the Battle of Nogales (1915). The inability of the various political factions in Mexico to reach consensus on fundamental political, social and economic reforms prevented the conclusion of the Mexican Revolution until a significant time after the 1918 Battle of Ambos Nogales.

During the November 1915 Battle of Nogales fought between the forces of Francisco Villa and Carranza (led by Gen. Álvaro Obregón and Gen. Plutarco Elías Calles), one U.S. serviceman, Pvt. Stephen B. Little, was killed by a stray bullet as U.S. troops guarded the border in Nogales from the violence in Mexico. The carrancistas won the battle over Villa's forces despite three-way firing across the border. Carrancista forces had received diplomatic recognition from the U.S. government as the legitimate ruling force in Mexico. Villa, who had previously courted U.S. recognition, then attacked the American border community of Columbus, New Mexico. This led directly to further border tensions as U.S. President Woodrow Wilson unilaterally dispatched the Punitive Expedition, under Gen. John Pershing, into the state of Chihuahua to apprehend or kill Villa. Although the manhunt for Villa was unsuccessful, small-scale confrontations in the communities of Parral and Carrizal nearly brought about a war between Mexico and the U.S. in the summer of 1916. Additionally, National Guard units of various states were deployed to the U.S.-Mexico border—including Nogales, Arizona—to bolster border security as the Punitive Expedition continued its operations in Chihuahua. The militarization of the border region during this time has led to this period—which includes the Mexican Revolution, the Punitive Expedition and the U.S. entry into World War I—being termed the so-called Border War.

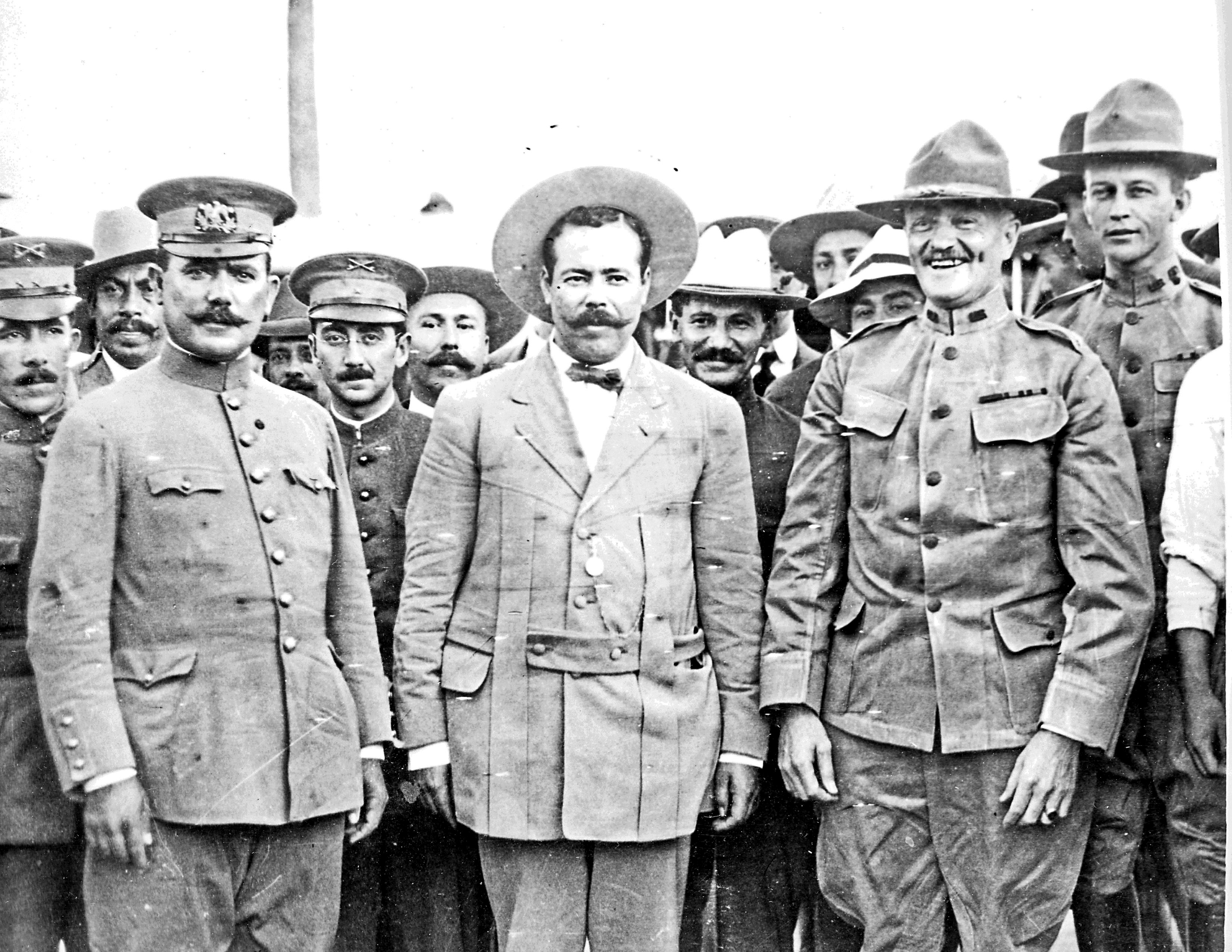
Generals Álvaro Obregón, Pancho Villa and John J. Pershing (behind Pershing is Lt. George S. Patton).

Despite its initial policy of neutrality, various factors such as unrestricted submarine warfare and the publication of the Zimmermann telegram caused the U.S. to declare war on Germany in April 1917, entering World War I on the side of the Allied powers.

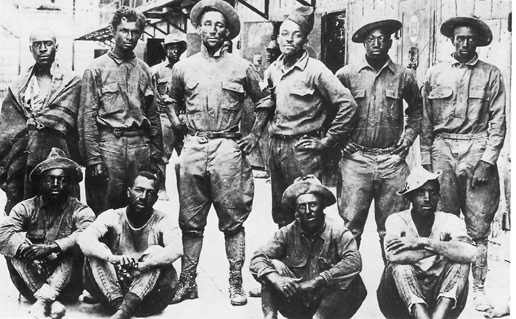
Buffalo Soldiers of the U.S. 10th Cavalry Regiment who were taken prisoner during the Battle of Carrizal, Chihuahua, in 1916

After the U.S. entered World War I, the 10th Cavalry was based at Fort Huachuca, Arizona, with elements of that regiment also being stationed in Camp Stephen Little, the army post just north of Nogales. The training and operations Pershing and his forces experienced during the Punitive Expedition prepared them for combat in the Western Front as the American Expeditionary Forces (AEF); consequently, many of the National Guard units deployed to guard the border during the Punitive Expedition were sent to other areas, including the European theater. To fill in the gap, different U.S. military units were deployed to the border, including the celebrated "Buffalo Soldiers" of the 10th Cavalry. The presence of the 10th Cavalry in Nogales is significant, as this unit was a key participant in the Battle of Carrizal, which could have served as the spark for a U.S.-Mexico War during the Punitive Expedition. Additionally, the presence of the battle-tested 10th Cavalry in the border community of Ambos Nogales—as opposed to joining the AEF at the Western Front—is also suggestive of the racial/social priorities of the U.S. at the time.

Besides the obvious concern with spill-over violence along the border, U.S. military leaders along the border carried out surveillance of German espionage activities. With the British interception of the Zimmermann telegram in 1917, the U.S. knew well of the German Empire's attempt to bring Mexico into the war on the side of the Central Powers. U.S. anxiety over Germany's overtures to Mexico notwithstanding, the war-weary Mexican nation was in a markedly disadvantaged position from which to engage in the sort of military reconquest of the U.S. Southwest (an area that had been Mexican national territory prior to the 1846–48 U.S.–Mexico War and its peace, the 1848 Treaty of Guadalupe Hidalgo) that was envisioned in the Zimmermann telegram. The seemingly interminable Mexican Revolution led to the devastation of the overall Mexican economy, causing food shortages throughout the nation (including northern Sonora) and a mass migration of Mexicans into the United States through ports of entry such as Nogales. Additionally, the 1916-17 Punitive Expedition vividly exposed the differences between the U.S. and Mexico in terms of logistics. Though recognized as the legitimate leader of the Mexican Republic, President Carranza did not control large swaths of territory—such as the regions held by Francisco Villa and Emiliano Zapata. Moreover, the U.S. use of motor vehicles and two airplanes during the Punitive Expedition stood in stark contrast to the conditions existing within the Mexican Federal Army and the various disparate militias, where weapons, bullets, uniforms and even food could often be in very short supply.

=== World War I and national security anxiety in the borderlands ===
The U.S. entry into World War I led to a mass mobilization of national resources that was soon felt along the border. U.S. restrictions on foodstuffs limited what Nogales border crossers could take back into Mexico. Even as the violence and upheaval of the Mexican Revolution produced scarcity throughout Sonora, U.S. border authorities strictly enforced the restrictions and routinely arrested nogalenses (citizens of Nogales, Sonora) who attempted to smuggle contraband out of the U.S. In the summer of 1918 the U.S. government threatened to close the border if Mexican authorities refused to help stop the "food running".

U.S. involvement in the European war also led to formalization of security measures along the border. In an effort to exercise greater control over the border zone, the State Department called on American citizens to register for passports as soon as possible. These new regulations had a profound impact, as they halted the free transit across the open and unobstructed international line that had defined the relationship between Ambos Nogales. Moreover, entry into Nogales, Arizona, was now restricted to designated inspection stations along International Street, with soldiers posted at intervals along the international line to control human traffic into the U.S. For nogalenses who were accustomed to free passage between the two cities, these rules demanded a difficult adjustment that led to growing hostility between citizens of the two countries.

By August 1918 the U.S. State Department had tightened wartime control at the border by limiting passport-carrying Mexican laborers to two entries per day and restricting non-workers to one crossing per week. A Nogales newspaper reported that the new rules had "greatly curtailed traffic from the Mexican side of the international border, and there is universal weeping among retail merchants of Nogales, Arizona, who see 'panicky' times ahead, for those who depend on citizens of the other side of the international line, to swell their daily receipts". Although businesses in Nogales, Arizona, protested, the persons most affected were working-class nogalenses who depended on wages from their jobs in the U.S.

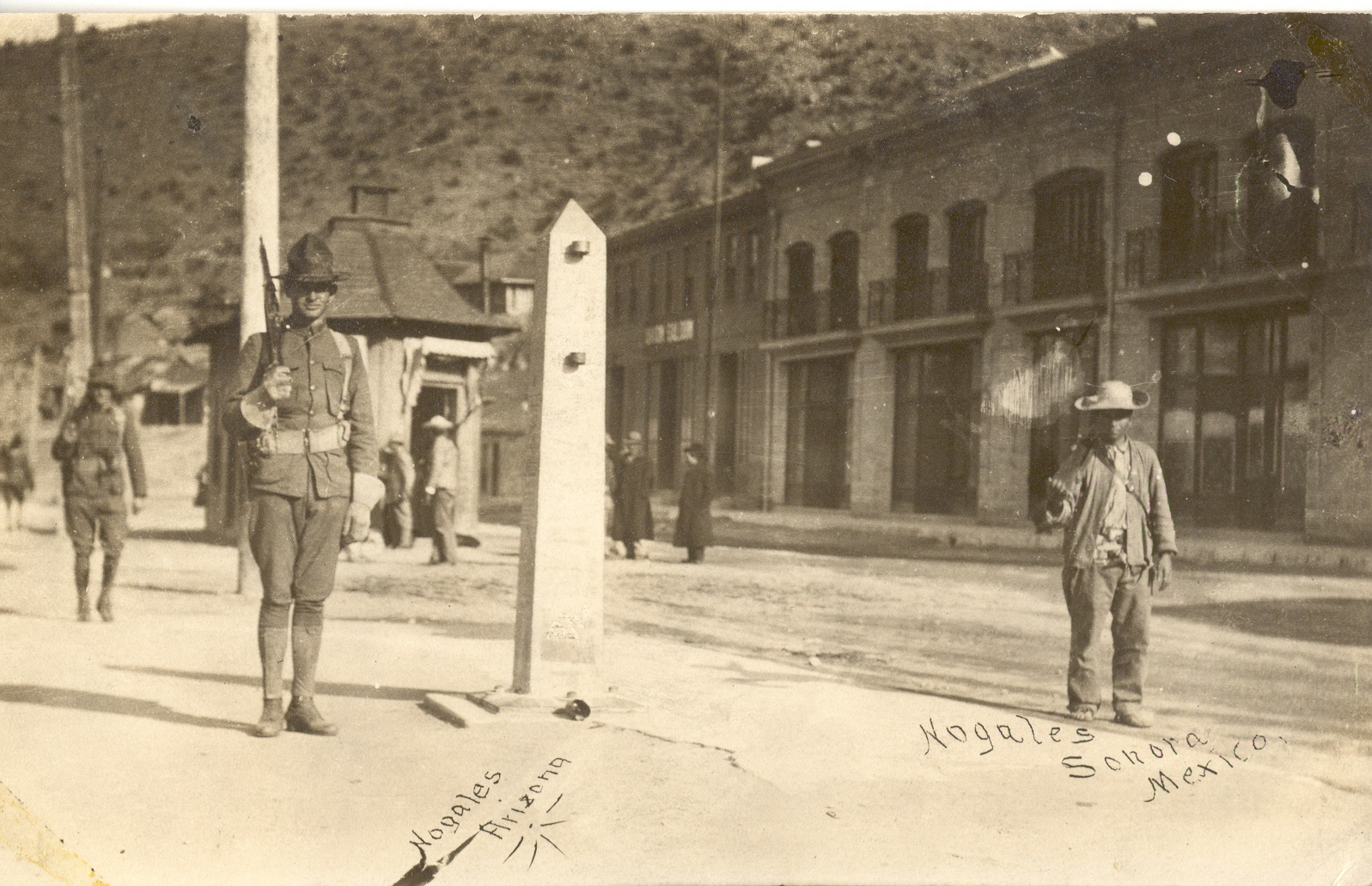
American and Mexican soldiers guarding International Street in Ambos Nogales. The obelisk in the center is a border marker, which still stands. A Mexican border post is in the middle foreground of the image. The Americans had a similar one on their side.

In the months leading up to August 1918, U.S. customs officials at Nogales killed at least two individuals who were attempting to enter the U.S. along the vaguely defined border. On the afternoon of 31 December 1917 Francisco Mercado, an off-duty Mexican customs agent, attempted to cross into Nogales, Arizona, despite calls from a U.S. Army sentry who asked him, in English, to stop. Before various eyewitnesses, the soldier shot and killed Mercado. The killing of Gerardo Pesqueira, the deaf-mute son of former Sonoran governor Ignacio Pesqueira es:Ignacio L. Pesqueira, further angered the people of Nogales, Sonora. U.S. sentries ordered the unarmed man to halt as he approached the border. Unable to hear the order, Pesqueira continued walking, whereupon the guards opened fire, killing him. Pesqueira "was known for his caring and cheerful nature. Historian Parra, citing U.S. Gen. DeRosey Cabell's August 1918 military investigation on the incident, highlights that this—along with the crude attitude shown by U.S. customs agents towards ordinary Mexican border crossers during day-to-day transiting of the border—created a profound sense of resentment of U.S. guards by Mexican border agents. The seeming impunity of U.S. border guards was becoming increasingly intolerable to nogalenses, a point made by Gen. Cabell and U.S. Consul in Nogales, Sonora, E.M. Lawton and Vice-consul W.A. Maguire. However, in a brief passage from his 1921 book History of the Tenth Cavalry, 1866-1921 Edward Glass indicates that changes in Mexican officials and soldier attitudes helped contribute to the tense situation.

=== German espionage or national security hysteria in the borderlands ===
Allegations of foreign wrongdoing arose from the U.S. Army units that claimed their Intelligence Division in Southern Arizona reported that Germans were instructing the Mexican Army in military procedures and helping build defenses. Lt. Col. Frederick J. Herman of the 10th Cavalry (the acting commander in Nogales at the time) claimed to have received an "anonymous letter" written by an "unknown Mexican" claiming to be an ex-Villa officer in which he warned U.S. authorities of an imminent attack on Nogales slated to take place on 25 August 1918.

In his 1921 history of the 10th Cavalry, author Edward Glass states the importance of these reports as "About 15 August 1918, the Intelligence Division reported the presence of strange Mexicans, plentifully supplied with arms, ammunition, food and clothing, gathering in increasing numbers in and about Nogales, Sonora." He also indicated the presence of several white men, apparently Germans in uniforms, instructing Mexican soldiers and militia in military methods. About this time a letter was received, written by a person who claimed to have been a major in Villa's forces. It reportedly stated the person was sickened and disgusted at the atrocities committed by Villa and his men, and without pay or reward, because of "friendly respect" for American troops, warned them of the German financial efforts and influences at work near and in Nogales. These German "agent provocateurs" were encouraging some type of attack on Nogales "on or about 25 August 1918." Lt. Robert Scott Israel, Infantry Intelligence Officer at Nogales, brought this letter to the attention of Lt. Col. Herman, 10th Cavalry, then acting subdistrict commander at Nogales. Further investigation revealed that so many points of the letter were verified that "the letter was given more than ordinary weight."

However, in a 2010 article by Carlos F. Parra, which includes additional details of the incident, the author highlights how neither the suggestive intelligence reports nor the alleged letter to Lt. Col. Herman were mentioned at all during the extensive U.S. military investigation that took place immediately after 27 August incident. The investigation of the Battle of Ambos Nogales instead traced the origins of the violence to the abusive practices of U.S. customs officials and the resentment caused by the killings along the border during the previous year. In the written transcripts of the investigators' interviews with Lt. Col. Herman, the local commander made no mention whatsoever of the letter he later claimed to have received from the "unknown" and disgruntled Villista defector. The omission of such powerful evidence from an investigation conducted mere hours after the battle took place makes the existence of these intelligence reports and Lt. Col. Herman's letter (which does not appear in the U.S. Army investigation's document collection for this battle) highly suspect.

== Battle ==
On 27 August 1918, at about 4:10 pm, a gun battle erupted unintentionally when a civilian Mexican carpenter named Zeferino Gil Lamadrid attempted to pass through the border back to Mexico, without having the bulky parcel he was carrying with him inspected at the United States Customs house. As Gil Lamadrid passed the customs office, Customs Inspector Arthur G. Barber ordered him to halt, suspecting that Gil Lamadrid was smuggling weapons. Only a few feet away, Mexican customs officers led by Francisco Gallegos directed him to ignore the summons and stay put in Mexico. Gil Lamadrid became confused and hesitated as the two groups of customs agents shouted instructions to him. At this point Pvt. William Klint of the U.S. 35th Infantry raised his Springfield rifle in an effort to force Gil Lamadrid to return to the U.S. In the midst of the ensuing commotion, a shot was fired (although it is suspected it was only a warning shot to the air fired by Pvt. Klint to prevent Zeferino from taking his cargo further in to Mexico), however by whom remains unclear, and the battle of Ambos Nogales commenced.

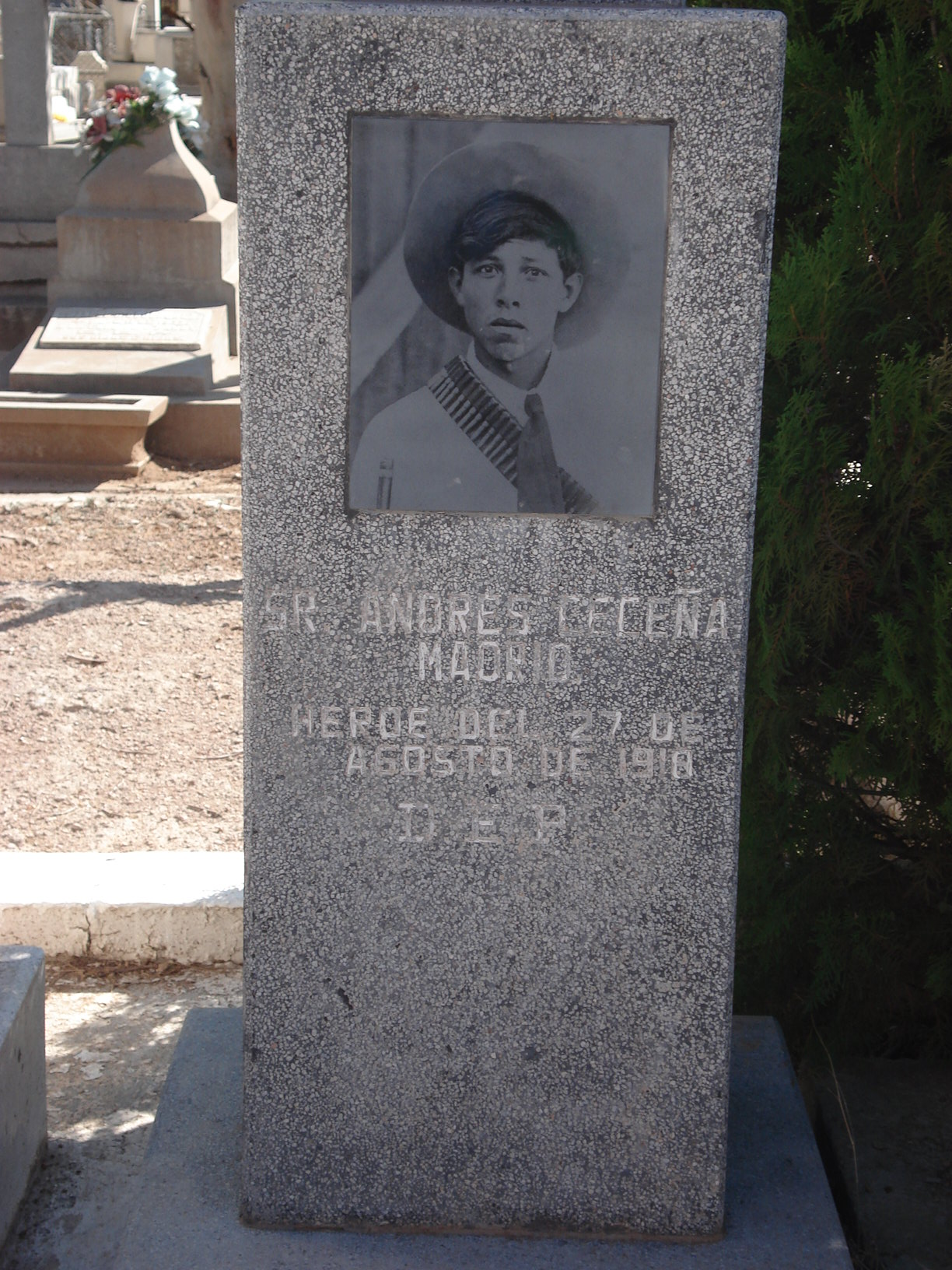
The tomb of Andrés Ceceña, a Mexican customs official killed during the 27 Aug. 1918 Battle of Ambos Nogales, is located in Heróica Nogales, Sonora's Panteón de los Héroes.

Mistakenly believing that he was being shot at, Gil Lamadrid dropped to the ground. Perhaps thinking that Gil Lamadrid had been shot, Customs Officer Gallegos grabbed his pistol and opened fire on the U.S. guards, killing Pvt. Klint with a shot to the face. Inspector Barber drew his revolver and returned fire, killing Gallegos and fellow Customs Officer Andrés Ceceña. In the confusion Gil Lamadrid jumped up and sprinted down a nearby street, exiting the narrative of the battle that he had inadvertently started. Gil Lamadrid died in an altercation in a Nogales, Sonora, bar in 1935 near where the Battle of Ambos Nogales initially took place.

=== Combat along the border and the U.S. Army incursion into Nogales, Sonora ===
Many citizens on the Mexican side of the border, hearing the gunfire, ran to their homes and picked up their rifles to join the Mexican troops fighting. Although it was later speculated that most of the combatants were soldiers of the Mexican Federal Army, in fact part of the Nogales garrison was away fighting rebels opposed to Gen. Plutarco Elías Calles' governorship of Sonora. Several Mexican soldiers, acting without orders, were certainly among the combatants, but the majority of the combatants were civilians—a fact confirmed by a U.S. military investigation of the incident.

The 35th Infantry, stationed at Nogales, requested reinforcements. Buffalo Soldiers of the 10th Cavalry, commanded by Lt. Col. Frederick Herman, came to their aid from Camp Stephen Little, located just north of Nogales. Herman ordered an attack south of the border to secure the Mexican hilltops overlooking the Sonoran border town. Defensive trenches and machine gun emplacements had been seen being dug on those hilltops during the previous weeks. Herman wanted his forces to occupy the position before Mexican reinforcements got there. In the frenzy of the unexpected battle, armed Mexican civilians stormed the home of Gen. Álvaro Obregón on International Street and used its sturdy stone walls as a strongpoint from which to fire at U.S. targets. Although the important Mexican revolutionary general (and future President) was not home, his terrified family was, and as a sign of the links between the two cities of Nogales, were personally escorted to the home of relatives on the U.S. side by the U.S. Consul in Nogales, Sonora, E.M. Lawton.

Under heavy fire, the U.S. infantry and dismounted cavalry crossed the border through the buildings and streets of Nogales, Sonora. Members of the 10th Cavalry advanced through a building in the red-light district of the Mexican border town where many of the "frightened señoritas" recognized them, according to First Sgt. Thomas Jordan of the 10th Cavalry. Jordan remarked, "I got a laugh when one them spoke to a trooper, saying 'Sergeant Jackson! Are we all glad to see you!' But we did not have time to tarry for the soldier to alibi his acquaintanceship." As the troops advanced into the city, many of these women ventured out with bedsheets marked with impromptu red crosses in an effort to rescue persons wounded in the fighting. Two of the brave women ignored their own wounds to help rescue their fellow citizens. American civilians and women helped in rescuing the wounded on the American side. One American soldier received an award from the American citizens for his actions in saving noncombatants who had been wounded, despite being wounded himself.

U.S. and Mexican sources differ on the success of U.S. troops taking the imposing hills immediately to the east of the two cities of Nogales. U.S. sources indicate that the heights were taken (and held until that evening's cease-fire) by a combined assault of the 10th Cavalry and 35th Infantry. For their part, Mexican sources, such as the contemporary "Corrido de Nogales" (a Mexican ballad about the battle's main events), highlight the participation of the Buffalo Soldiers of the 10th Cavalry during the assault on these hills. In the "Corrido de Nogales", it is also claimed that the Mexican townspeople of Nogales stopped the assault on that hill at the eastern end of the Nogales communities. Nevertheless, during the assault Capt. Joseph D. Hungerford was killed by a bullet to the heart while leading the 10th Cavalry charge on the hill. Meanwhile, a few U.S. civilians used their vehicles to shuttle troops toward the border, but only one U.S. military vehicle, driven by Private James Flavian Lavery, crossed the border, delivering supplies and retrieving the wounded. Lavery was decorated with the Distinguished Service Cross for his actions. American militia who became involved stayed on the American side, firing their weapons from the windows of their houses. Allyn Watkins, an eyewitness to the shooting from the rooftops of homes along a tall hill on the U.S. side, claimed that the disordered involvement of U.S. civilians in the border fight "didn’t help the progress of the 'war' any". Late in the fighting, members of the 35th Infantry placed a machine gun on top of a stone building and fired into the Mexican positions. The capture of the heights and this machine gun fire encouraged the end of the fighting.

=== Death of Mayor Peñaloza and a cease-fire ===
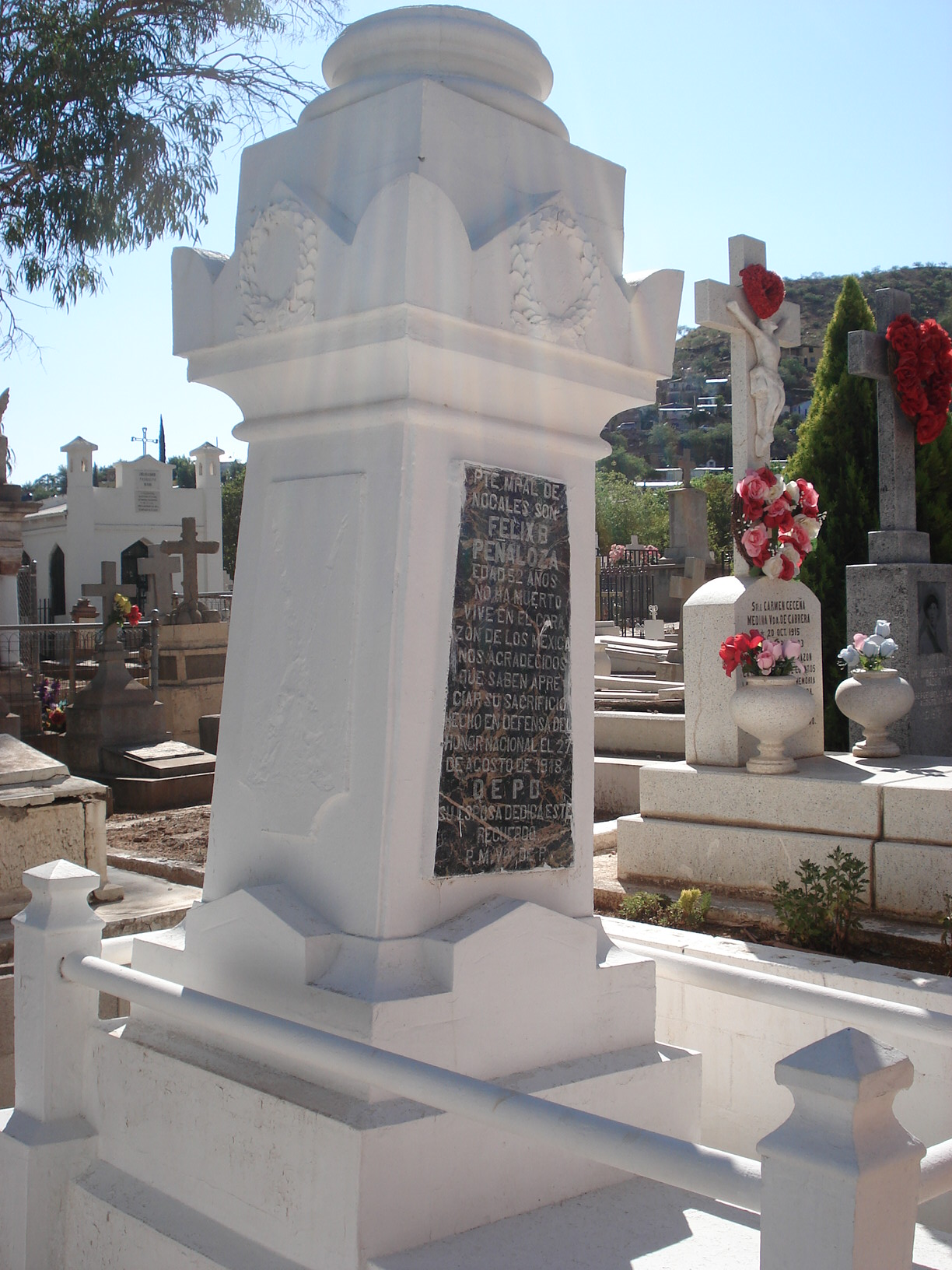
The tomb of Felix B. Penaloza (Mayor of Nogales, Sonora, in August 1918) at the Panteon de los Heroes, Heroica Nogales, Sonora, Mexico

As the violence escalated, the Mayor of Nogales, Sonora, Felix B. Peñaloza, sought to stop the shooting. The 53-year-old presidente municipal took a white handkerchief, tied it to his cane and ran into the streets of his city hoping to quell the violence. As U.S. troops advanced into the streets of Nogales, Sonora, from their positions across the line, Presidente Peñaloza pleaded with the angry nogalenses to put down their weapons. Despite later accounts to the contrary by U.S. military personnel (including Lt. Col. Herman), an official note from the U.S. Consulate in Nogales, Sonora, confirmed that a shot "from the Arizona side" felled the Mexican mayor. The mortally wounded Peñaloza was dragged into a nearby pharmacy, "where nothing could be done to save him". He died a half-hour later.

With Peñaloza's death, panicked officials in the Nogales, Sonora, city hall and the Mexican Consul in Nogales, Arizona, Jose Garza Zertuche, worked to bring about a cease-fire before further bloodshed. After initial contacts with Lt. Col. Herman were unsuccessful in ending the violence—the military commander in Nogales, Arizona, was wounded in the thigh during the fight—local Mexican officials agreed to raise a white flag over the community's most prominent structure at the time, the Mexican customs house. About 7:45 pm the Mexicans waved a large white flag of surrender over their customs building. Lt. Col. Herman observed this and ordered an immediate cease-fire. Snipers on both sides continued shooting for a while after the cease fire, but were eventually silenced by the efforts of their leaders on both sides. As a tenuous and suspicious peace fell on the border community, sporadic rifle shots were heard throughout the night, causing many to fear further violence. Subsequently, many non-combatants in Nogales, Sonora, fled south, away from their city. The international border in this important port of entry remained closed until late the next day.

== Aftermath ==
=== Bi-national diplomatic talks and the U.S. investigation ===
Within hours of the outbreak of violence in Ambos Nogales, leaders of the two governments dispatched officials to investigate the Nogales incident and determine what could be done to resolve the situation. President Carranza sent Sonoran governor Plutarco Elías Calles to represent the Mexican government in diplomatic talks scheduled for 28 August, while Gen. DeRosey Cabell, a veteran of the Punitive Expedition, represented the U.S. and sought information on the violence. "I met with General Calles at 3 o’clock, having previously received a telegram from him expressing regret at the unfortunate incident of yesterday afternoon", Cabell remarked. "Upon meeting with General Calles I have expressed equal regret that this incident should have occurred".

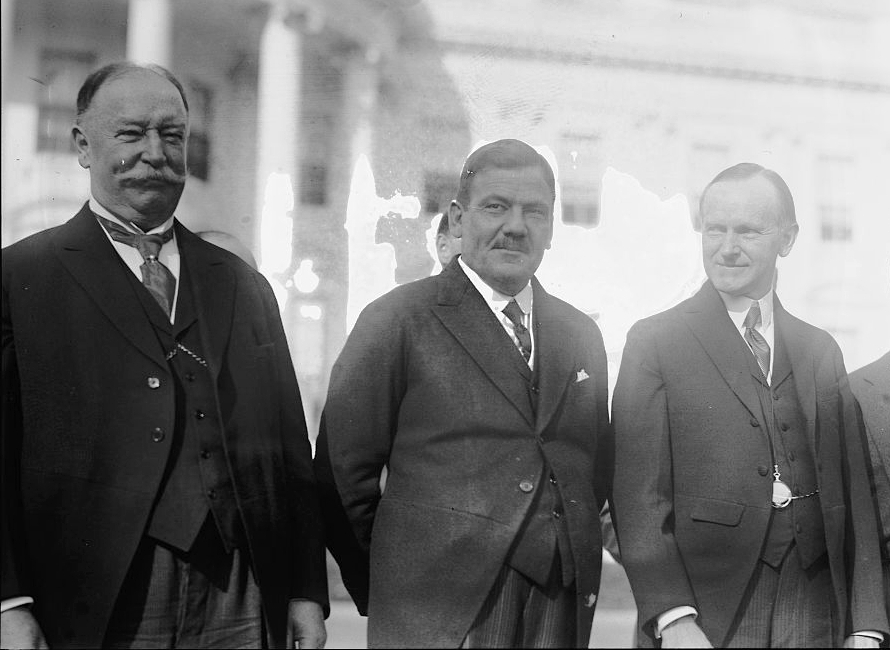
Supreme Court Justice (and former U.S. president) William Howard Taft, Mexican President Plutarco Elías Calles and U.S. President Calvin Coolidge at the White House, 1924: Although future-president Elías Calles' involvement in settling the Ambos Nogales dispute was small when compared to his later accomplishments, it was indicative of the Sonoran leader's growing stature in Mexican politics during the 1910s and '20s.

Cabell reiterated the U.S. demand that Sonoran officials halt the sporadic shooting from the Mexican side of the border, to which Calles said that the shooters were "irresponsible men" and beyond his control. All civilians in Nogales, Sonora, had been ordered to turn in their weapons to the authorities; some, however, retained their arms. In addition to exchanging mutual assurances of peace, Cabell and Calles each pledged to investigate the incident. Border traffic resumed as the military conference continued, and peace apparently had returned to Ambos Nogales. Before full normality returned to the community, a U.S. soldier was wounded by fire from the Mexican side; after lying in the post hospital for a few hours, the angry trooper went to the border and shot and wounded a Mexican sentry keeping guard. After a brief but angry exchange with Calles, Cabell ordered the arrest of the vengeful army private and prevented further violence.

Cabell conducted an investigation in which he and his associates interviewed a range of civilians (including U.S. Consul Lawton) and military personnel in an attempt to determine what caused the border violence that 27 August. After completing his investigation, Gen. Cabell informed his commanding officer that an unnamed U.S. customs inspector had been found guilty of "improper conduct" and removed from duty because of his harsh treatment of Mexicans. Cabell's report expressed dismay at the "frequent cases of insolence and overbearing conduct" among U.S. customs inspectors. The investigation laid the blame, albeit begrudgingly, for the outbreak of violence in Ambos Nogales on resentment among nogalenses over the routine mistreatment of Mexican border crossers.

Echoing Cabell's findings, José Garza Zertuche, the Mexican Consul in Nogales, wrote that "both peoples, Mexican and American, now deplore the unfortunate happenings on this frontier 27 August, last, and in which the lives of many soldiers of that country [United States] were lost". However, he also drew attention to the abuse from U.S. Customs and Immigration officials that had prompted the Mexican people to fight, and memorialized the "many Mexican civilians who laid down their lives in fitting protest against such humiliating and unjust conduct toward them".

Finally, Gen. Cabell's report recommended that a two-mile-long border fence be erected down the middle of International Street. That, Cabell wrote, "will do more [to] prevent friction than any other measure". Gov. Calles acceded to Cabell's proposal. "In opinion [of] both officials", the Nogales Herald reported, "[the] clash [of] August Twenty-Seventh and two previous clashes this year would have been averted had this fence been built". The raising of the first permanent border fence through the Ambos Nogales community is significant as it signaled the end of the previously open nature of the international border in this community. Although the Mexican Revolution and World War I, and their related tensions, faded by the early 1920s, the border security issue would remain a major concern culminating in the U.S. Immigration Act of 1924 and the establishment of the U.S. Border Patrol that year.

=== U.S. casualties ===
The United States Army suffered 4 dead and 29 wounded, of whom 1 died later of wounds
Killed in action:

- Klint, William H., Pvt., (H Co., First American KIA just after 4:10PM, just inside Mexico guarding U.S. Customs inspector Arthur G. Barber)
- Loftus, Luke W., 2nd Lt., (C Co., killed by sniper)
- Lots, Barney, Cpl., G Co.
- Whitworth, Frank, Cpl., H Co.
- Hungerford, Capt., 10th Cavalry, Troop C - the 35th Regimental History page for this battle states Hungerford was shot through the heart and killed instantly.

In addition, 16 men of the 35th Infantry were wounded. These included:

Wounded in action:

- Quartermaster Sgt. Victor Arana, with the 35th Infantry, was wounded.
- Pvt. A. L. Whitworth, Co. G, 35th Infantry, was hit in the groin.
- A private (Co. F, 35th Infantry) was hit and fell across the street from the home of "Colonel" A. T. Bird.

In addition, 12 soldiers from the 10th Cavalry were cited as wounded. These included:

- Lt. Col. Frederick J. Herman, Tenth Cavalry, the commander, suffered a slight but hampering leg wound.
- Capt. Henry C. Caron, Troop F, 10th Cavalry, was hit in the right arm below the elbow.

Known awards for bravery given:

- Lavery, James Flavian, Quartermaster Pvt., 35th Infantry, earned a Distinguished Service Cross at the Battle of Nogales for "braving the heaviest fire, repeatedly entering the zone of fire with his motor truck and carrying wounded men to places of safety, thereby saving the lives of several soldiers."
- Fannin, Oliver, Lt., G Co., 35th Infantry, would win the Distinguished Service Cross "For valor and bravery . . . while under fire, carried a wounded man to safety in the Nogales battle." He was also the recipient of a testimonial prepared by 33 of the leading citizens of Nogales.

This differs slightly from a list of the 35th Infantry Regiment who are listed as killed in action on 27 August 1918. It also cites one officer of the 10th as having been killed.

James Flavian Lavery, Quartermaster Private, 35th Infantry, earned a Distinguished Service Cross at the Battle of Nogales for "braving the heaviest fire, repeatedly entering the zone of fire with his motor truck and carrying wounded men to places of safety, thereby saving the lives of several soldiers." Oliver Fannin, Lieutenant, G Company, 35th Infantry, was awarded the Distinguished Service Cross "For valor and bravery ... while under fire, carried a wounded man to safety in the Nogales battle." He was also the recipient of a testimonial prepared by 33 of the leading citizens of Nogales. Arizona militia and civilian casualties were two dead and several wounded.

=== Mexican casualties ===
A great deal of uncertainty surrounds the actual number of Mexican casualties from the incident. According to John Robert Carter of the 25th Infantry Regiment (which replaced the 35th Infantry in Nogales), the U.S. believed that as many as 125 persons were killed and 300 wounded. However, the official report by the Mexican government lists the dead at 15, with special attention given to the actions of Francisco Gallegos, Andres Ceceña and the fallen mayor Felix B. Peñaloza (the latter of whom has been consistently ignored by the few U.S. observers who have written about the battle). Although the actual number of casualties between the wildly varying figures given by the U.S. and Mexican governments is uncertain, the Sonoran dead included three-year-old Julia Medina, 17-year-old María Esquivel and María Leal, shot while hanging clothes near the border.

- Mexican casualties were reported later, by John Robert Carter of the 25th Infantry Regiment as being 125 (28-30 in Mexican Army uniforms) killed and 300 wounded. Found among the Mexican dead were allegedly two German agents. Neither Carter nor the 25th Infantry Regiment were in Nogales when the battle or its immediate aftermath occurred (the 25th Infantry replaced the 35th Infantry Regiment in Nogales). Evidence suggests some elements of the Mexican garrison in Nogales, Mexico, participated in the battle but local newspapers such as the Nogales Herald noted that the majority of the unit had left Nogales in the days before the battle to engage anti-government rebels led by revolutionist Juan Cabral near Sasabe.
- According to the U.S. Army official report, the graves for 129 Mexicans were dug. However, Mexican casualties reported in various newspapers ranged from 30 to 130 dead and over 300 wounded in action. U.S. military historians Edward Glass and James Finley, basing their conclusions on second-hand accounts, have written that the bodies of two alleged German advisors were recovered and examined by the U.S. Army after the 27 August battle and then buried. According to Glass and Finley, the two bodies possessed papers with German writing while other alleged German advisors reportedly fled southward along with frightened Mexican townspeople from Nogales. Finley also claimed that in the days after the battle the remains of the two alleged Germans were disinterred and their whereabouts became unknown.
- No evidence (such as the deceased Germans' documents) exists to support Glass and Finley's claims about German involvement in the battle in either local, state, or national archives on either side of the border. Oral histories of elderly Nogales residents conducted by the Pimeria Alta Historical Society in the 1960s and 1970s indicated that people who lived in the community during the battle were not familiar with the claims of German espionage in Ambos Nogales. Furthermore, archival collections at the U.S. National Archives such as the U.S. Army's Adjutant General Office documents and the U.S. Department of State's Consular Records for Nogales, Mexico (including correspondence from Secretary of State Robert Lansing to the U.S. Ambassador to Mexico) make clear that the Battle of Ambos Nogales was a conflict entirely of a local character between the U.S. and Mexican nationals.
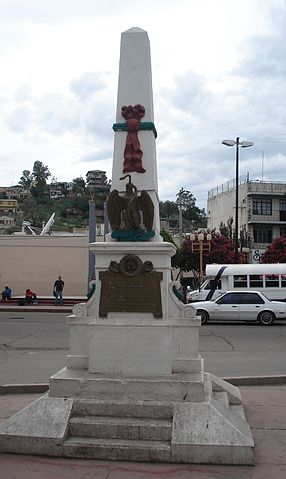
Monument to the Mexican participants of the Battle of Ambos Nogales located just south of the border on Calle Adolfo Lopez Mateos in Nogales, Sonora.

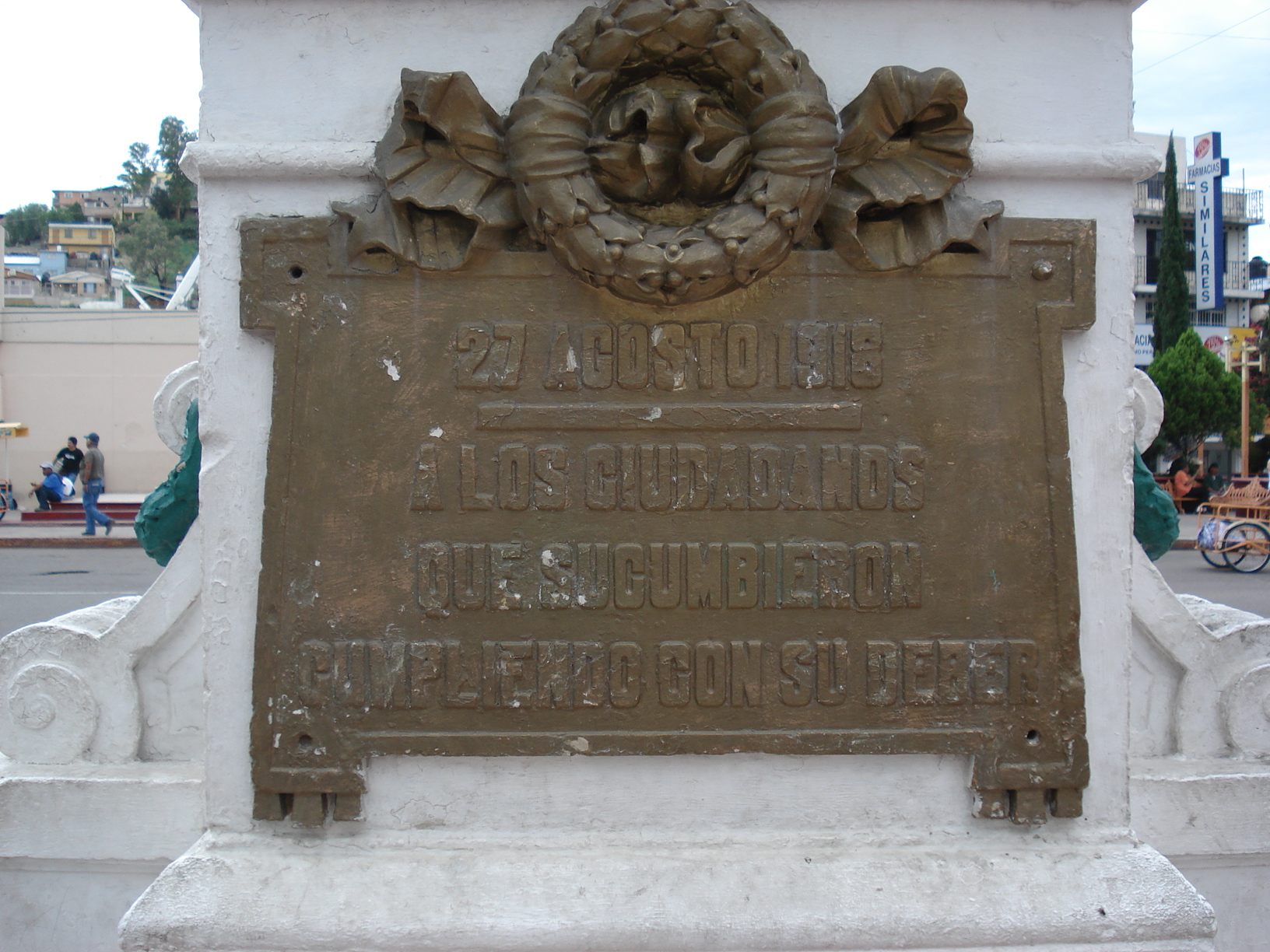
A close up of the Battle of Ambos Nogales Memorial in Heroica Nogales, Sonora. "27 August 1918: Dedicated to the citizens who fell fulfilling their [patriotic] duties."

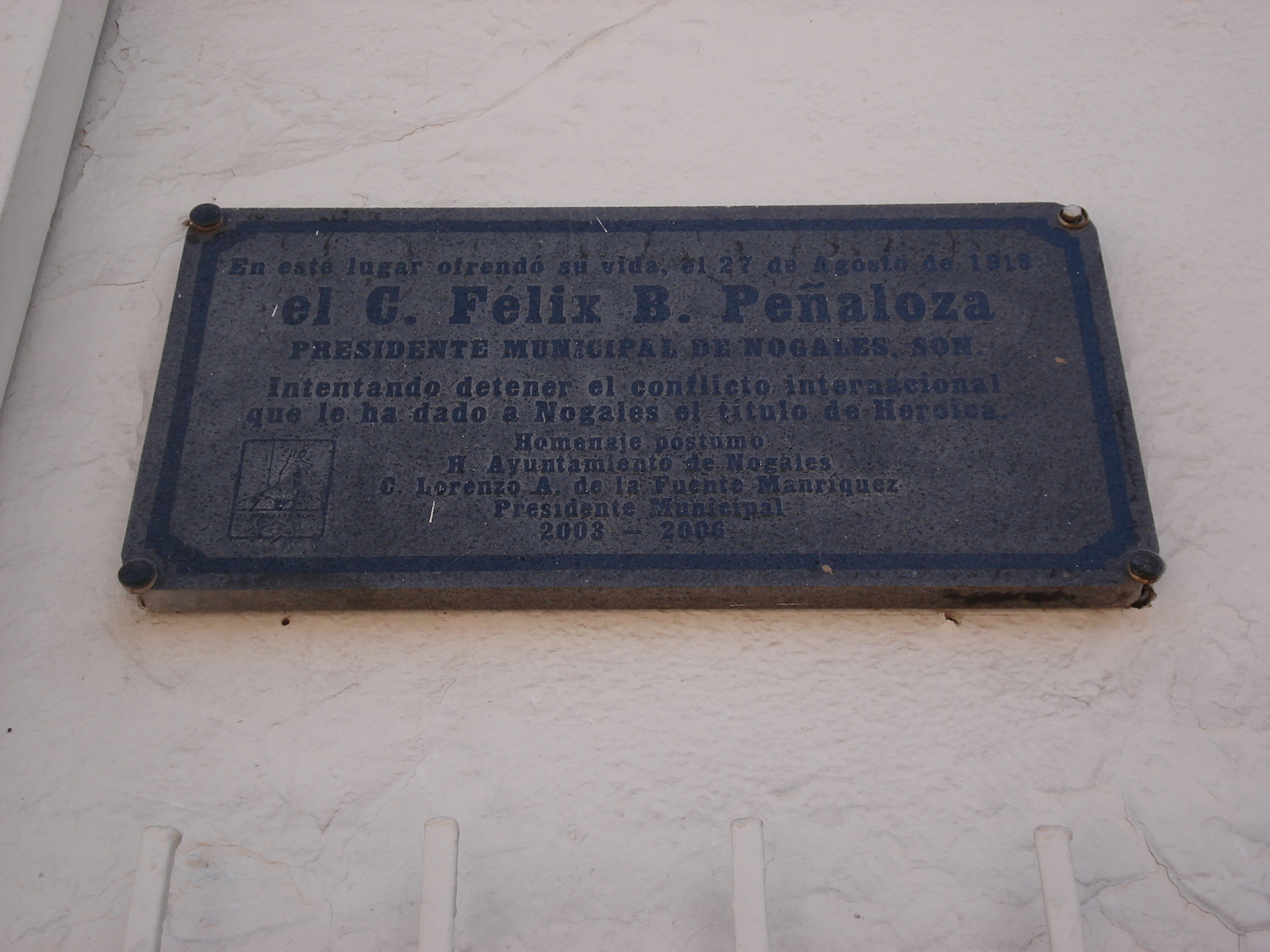
Historical marker on Calle Ruiz Cortines in Heróica Nogales, Sonora, indicating the place where Felix Peñaloza died on 27 August 1918.

=== Alleged German involvement ===
The U.S. government's investigation into the Battle of Ambos Nogales indicated that the origins of the violence were found in the resentment Mexican nationals felt from the U.S. Customs officials' poor treatment and the sense of impunity that took place when the killers of Francisco Mercado and Gerardo Pesqueira went unpunished. Nevertheless, low-level rumors circulated of potential German involvement in this battle. Echoing the comments of some U.S. participants in the battle, James P. Finley wrote in Huachuca Illustrated "found among the Mexican dead were the bodies of two German agents provocateurs." No further corroborating evidence—such as a description of these individuals' particular persons, belongings or potential intelligence reconnaissance from Nogales residents—is presented by Finley or other authors who have written on the topic. Fred Herman, whose wartime rank of lieutenant colonel had been reverted to his regular army (i.e. peacetime) rank of captain, testified before a congressional committee headed by New Mexico Sen. Albert Fall that he believed that German agents led the Mexican combatants during the 27 August battle.

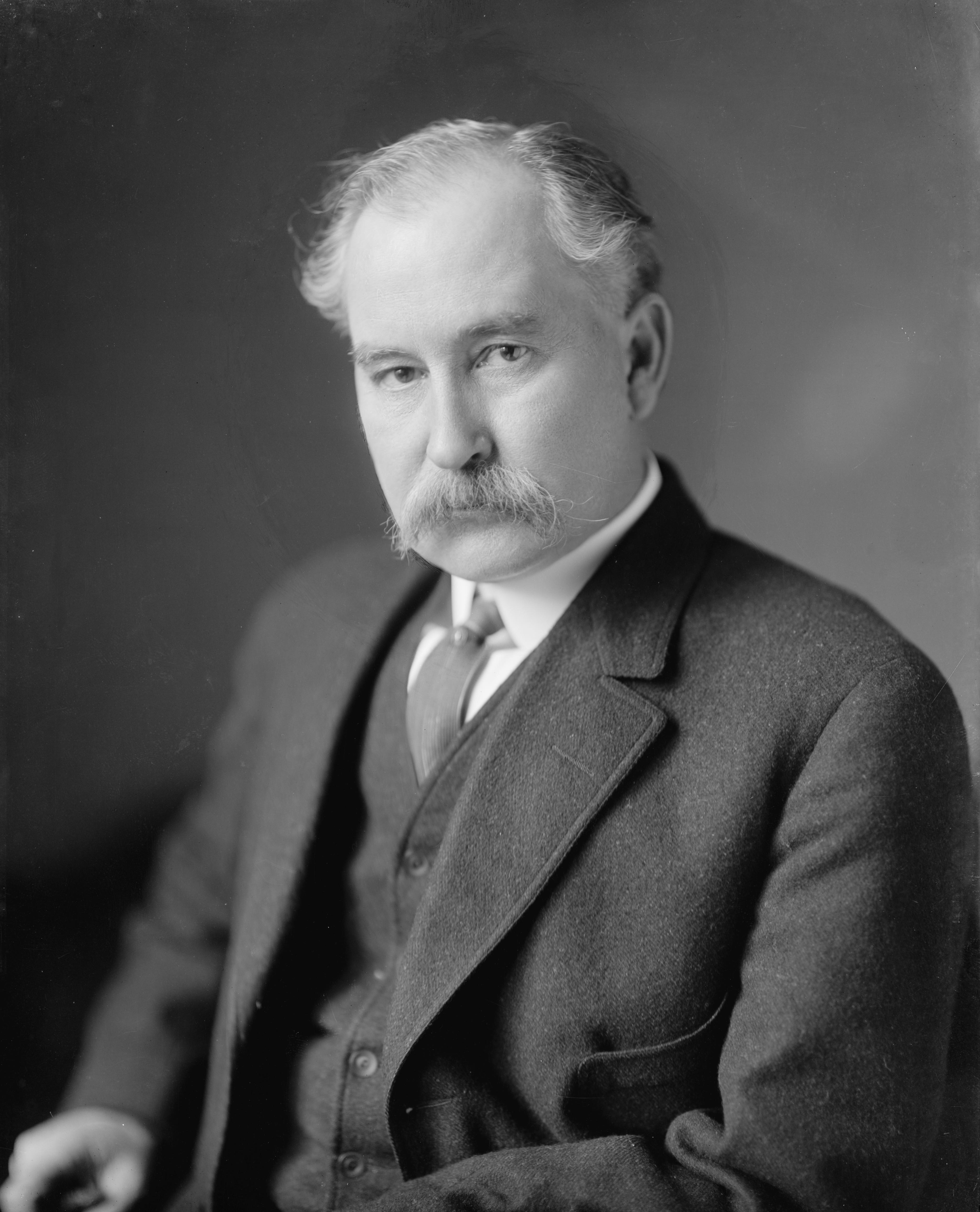
U.S. Sen. Albert Fall of New Mexico, angry over the 1917 Mexican Constitution's calls for the nationalization of the oil industry, Fall—with deep ties to the oil industry—sought to pressure the Mexican government from enacting such policies through coercive measures, such as threats of military intervention in Mexico. His congressional hearings in 1920 on border outrages included testimony from the former military commander in Nogales, Arizona, Fred Herman.

Herman claimed that "German-looking men in uniforms" were the culprits of the Battle of Ambos Nogales citing his documentation. Historians who have investigated the brief conflict have generally repeated Herman's allegations at the expense of obscuring the social tensions that led to the battle.

== Legacy ==
The sudden burst of violence associated with the Battle of Ambos Nogales, soon followed by the resolution of the conflict by Cabell and Calles, coupled with the relatively low casualties of the confrontation, compared to the carnage associated with the Western Front, ensured that the battle would remain obscure. No monument or other physical historic memorial commemorates the battle on the U.S. side.

On the Mexican side, the batalla del 27 de agosto is also an obscure topic but less so. A Mexican corrido, "El Corrido de Nogales", it was composed by participants of the battle, memorializing the Mexican interpretation of the events of that day. The municipal leaders in Nogales, Sonora, erected a monument near the international boundary commemorating the Mexican participants and victims of the battle, and the municipal government continues to maintain the tombs of Mayor Peñaloza, Andres Ceceña, Maria Esquivel, and other victims in the city's Panteón de los Hėroes.

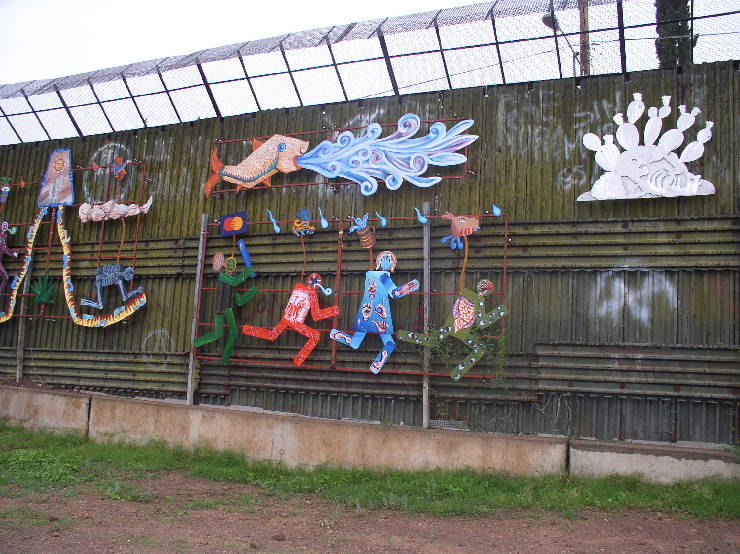
Pre-2011 U.S.–Mexico border wall as seen from the Mexican side along Calle Internacional in Heroica Nogales, Sonora

In 1961 the Mexican Congress further honored the memory of 27 August 1918 by granting the Mexican border town the title of "Heroic City", leading the community's official name, Heróica Nogales, a distinction shared with other Mexican cities such as Heróica Huamantla, Tlaxcala, and Heróica Veracruz, Veracruz, communities that also saw military confrontation between Mexicans and U.S. military forces.

=== Border fence ===
In addition to the physical reminders of the Battle of Ambos Nogales through monuments and folklore, the presence of the current US–Mexico border fence running through the community owes its existence at least in part to the events of 27 August 1918. Unlike earlier fences that had been erected and removed on International Street, the new border barrier was permanent. Although residents of Ambos Nogales continued to maintain strong familial ties across the international boundary, the border fence vividly signaled the transformation of the border community of Nogales into two different cities in two different nations.

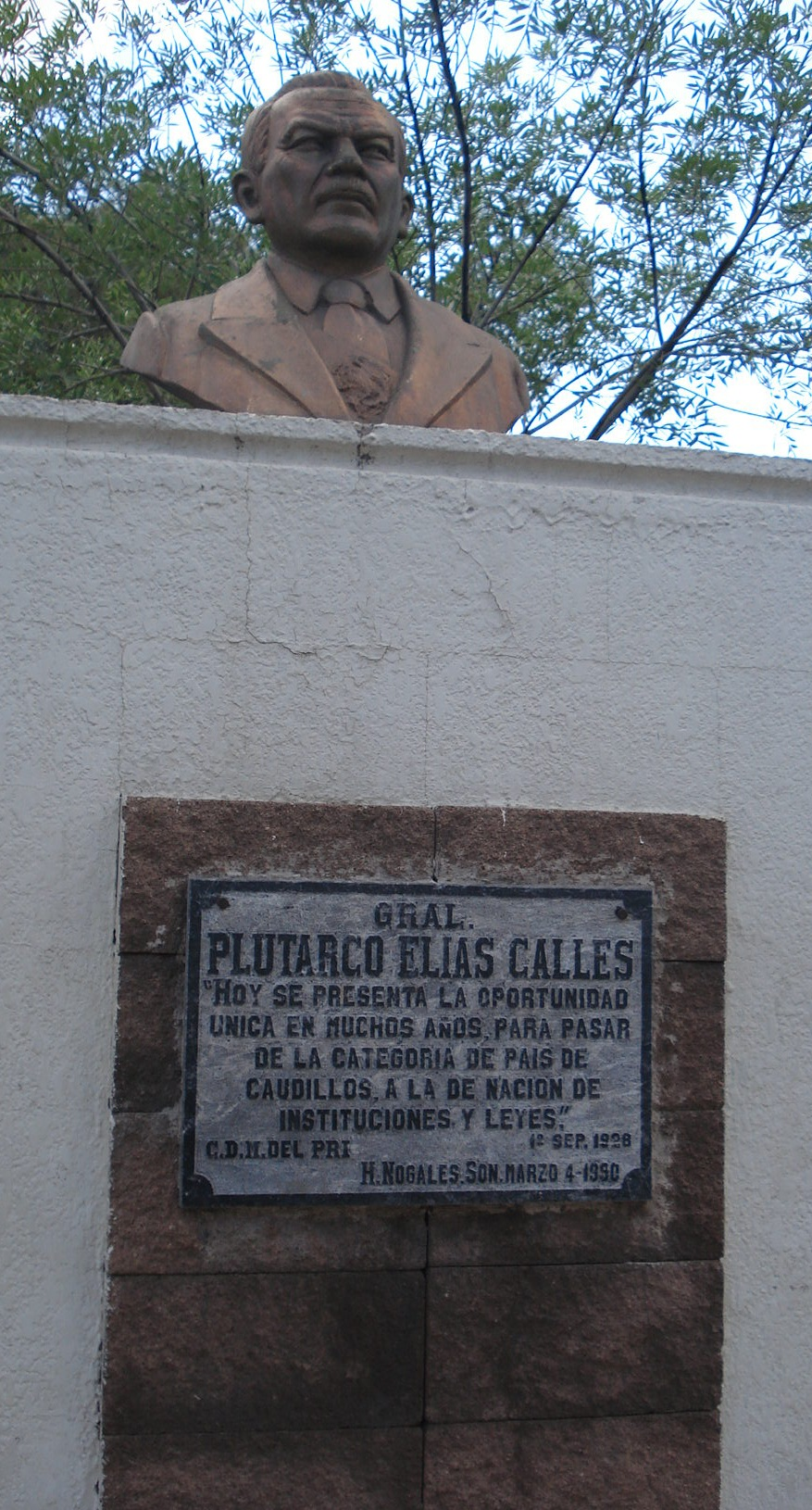
A monument dedicated to Gen. Plutarco Elias Calles, President of Mexico 1924-28 and a negotiator of peace between the US and Mexico in Nogales in August 1918: This monument is located on Calle Elias Calles in Heroica Nogales, Sonora, south of the Plaza Hidalgo.

== See also ==
- Battle of Nogales (disambiguation)
