= Nogales (surname) =

Nogales is a Spanish surname. Notable people with the surname include:

- Armando López Nogales (born 1950), Mexican former lawyer and politician
- Daniel Nogales (born 2003), Spanish racing driver
- Diego Nogales (born 1981), Spanish football manager
- Esteban Muñoz Nogales (born 1984), Spanish former professional footballer
- Eva Nogales, Spanish biophysicist
- Francisco Nogales (born 1946), Spanish pathologist
- Jose Luis Morales Nogales (born 1987), Spanish professional footballer
- José Nogales (1860–1908), Spanish journalist and writer
- José Nogales Sevilla (1860–1939), Spanish painter and watercolorist
- Manuel Chaves Nogales (1897–1944), Spanish journalist and writer
- Mariana Nogales Molinelli (born 1973), Puerto Rican lawyer, politician, and social activist
- Paola Nogales-Ascarrunz (born 1994), Bolivian biologist
- Rafael de Nogales, Venezuelan adventurer

== See also ==
- Nogales (disambiguation)
