= Nogales International Airport =

Nogales International Airport may refer to:

- Nogales International Airport (Mexico) in the state of Sonora
- Nogales International Airport (United States) in the state of Arizona

== See also ==
- Nogales International, a newspaper based in Nogales, Arizona, U.S.
- Nogales (disambiguation)
