= Francisco Nogales =

Spanish medical researcher

Francisco F. Nogales (born 1946 in Badajoz, Spain) is a Spanish pathologist and academic specializing in gynecopathology. He is a retired Spanish academic and physician and previously worked as Professor and Chairman of Pathology at the University of Granada in Spain from 1979 until 2018. He is now Professor Emeritus of Pathology.

== Education ==
Nogales' initial speciality was gynecology, but he later trained in pathology at the Fundación Jimenez Diaz in Madrid, where he completed his residency in pathology in 1974. He also trained under his father, Francisco Nogales Ortiz, the founder of Spanish Gynecologic Pathology. He later completed a fellowship at the University of Colorado in Denver, under G. Barry Pierce (a researcher on the role of stem cells in neoplasia and germ cell tumor research) and Dr. Steven G Silverberg (a well-known gynecological surgical pathologist). During that time, he also served as Chief Resident in the Department of Pathology at the University of Colorado Hospital.

== Career ==
After completing his education and training, he specialized in gynecologic surgical pathology as a professor at the University of Granada, where his research was focused on endometrial and ovarian pathology with a particular speciality in the area of the pathology of germ cell tumors. He made substantial advances in the evaluation of immature teratomas and the characterization and nomenclature of histopathologic types of yolk sac tumors by comparison with the embryologic development of early endoderm. In 2017, he edited a comprehensive monograph of Pathobiology of Germ Cell Tumors in different organs, supporting a new developmental classification based on their stemness/stem cell potency.

== Research ==
His research on these topics has been published widely. Nogales has published over 190 papers indexed on PubMed. He also edited or contributed to more than 20 international books and monographs, including the World Health Organization's classification of tumors of female reproductive organs (Blue Books of 2003 and 2014).

His research has been cited in the academic medical literature on uterine plexiform tumors, diagnostics for yolk sac tumors, genetic and environmental factors for testicular cancer, and in other areas. His work across all areas of gynecological pathology has been resulted in his being described by medical historians as "a leader in the field of the later years of the 20th century and into this century."

Between 1992 and 1994, he was president of the International Society of Gynecologic Pathologists. In addition, he holds several visiting and honorary professorships and doctorates from universities in Europe and the Americas. He is an active board member of the International Journal of Gynecological Pathology. He was the lead organizer for the 1985 Congress of the Spanish division of the International Academy of Pathology.

From 1999 to 2018, he ran a subspecialty fellowship program in Gynecologic Pathology at the University of Granada for over 80 young pathologists from more than 25 countries worldwide.

In 2010, he hosted a conference on placental pathology at the University of Granada. In 2016, a scientific meeting organized by the Spanish division of the International Academy of Pathology was held in his honor at the National Academy of Medicine in Madrid.

== Awards and honours ==
In 2017, he was awarded both the Ramon y Cajal award from the Spanish Society of Pathological Anatomy and the Spanish Division of the International Academy of Pathology. In 2017, he was also named Distinguished Teacher of Pathology by the Latin American Society of Pathology in recognition of his experience training pathologists across Latin America.

In 2022, a Nogales Family Fellowship was established at Gonville and Caius College at the University of Cambridge. The fellowship is presently held by a gynecologic oncologist.
