= Nogales High School =

Nogales High School may refer to:

- Nogales High School (Nogales, Arizona)
- Nogales High School (La Puente, California)
