= Battle of Nogales =

The term Battle of Nogales may refer to:

- Battle of Nogales (1913)
- Battle of Nogales (1915)
- Battle of Ambos Nogales (1918)
