= Ambos Nogales =

Two cities in the United States and Mexico

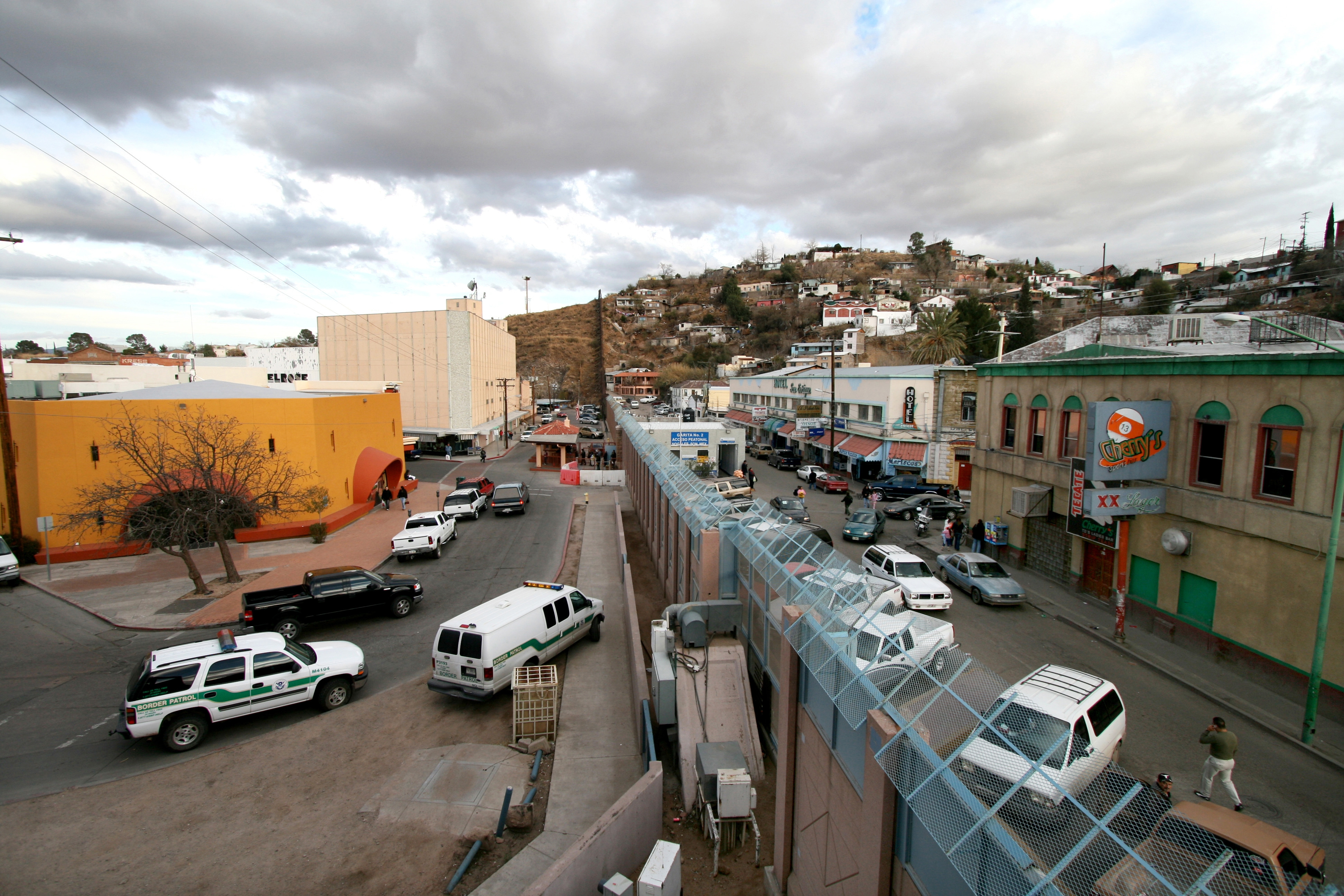
Border between Arizona, on the left, and Sonora, on the right.

Ambos Nogales (Spanish for "both Nogales") are two cities of Nogales, Arizona, United States, and Nogales, Sonora, Mexico. They lie 60 miles (97 km) directly south of Tucson, Arizona, divided by the Mexico–United States barrier. Though divided by the border between their respective nation states, the two municipalities have historically shared a sense of community alluded to in their description as "Ambos Nogales," as well as other sayings and phrases alluding to this camaraderie. The motto of Nogales, Sonora, is Juntos por amor a Nogales, meaning "United by the love of Nogales". Ambos Nogales has become a subject of anthropological and archaeological research due to the ways in which the material presence of the border wall has impacted the lives of those living in these cities. Investigation of community, migration, immigration (both legal and illegal), drug trafficking, gang violence, and all of the activities associated with these has occurred at Ambos Nogales due to its unique identity and geographic position.

== Material changes at the border ==
The barrier dividing Nogales, Arizona and Nogales, Sonora has undergone a handful of material changes from the 19th century up to the present. It was not until 1898 that a material division other than stone cairns and obelisks marked the division between the United States and Mexico, a line of telephone poles were installed along the border cut through Ambos Nogales and guard posts were implemented at the crossing gates between the two settlements. Additional material was added to the border by the United States in response to the Mexican Revolution (1911–1918) with the addition of a barbed wire fence. The next addition, also by the United States, was a six-foot-high chain link fence including electric lights and new gatehouses on both the United States and Mexican sides of the border. This chain-link fence constituted the barrier separating Ambos Nogales for the next 65 years and became a symbol of the relationship established between the two cities (see "Changes in Public Perception of the Border").
